= Iranian Armenians =

Ethnic group

Total population
- c. 70,000–500,000

Regions with significant populations
- Tehran; Tabriz; Esfahan (New Julfa); Urmia; Fereydan; Bourvari

Languages
- Armenian (Eastern); Persian

Religion
- Christianity (predominantly Armenian Apostolic with Armenian Catholic and Evangelical minorities)

Iranian Armenians (Armenian: իրանահայեր, romanized: iranahayer; Persian: ایرانی های ارمنی), also known as Persian Armenians (Armenian: պարսկահայեր, romanized: parskahayer; Persian: ارمنیان ایران), are Armenians living in Iran who invariably speak Armenian as their first language. Estimates of their number in Iran range from 70,000 to 500,000. Areas with a high concentration of them include Tabriz, Tehran, Salmas and New Julfa, Isfahan.

Armenians have lived for millennia in the territory that forms modern-day Iran. Many of the oldest Armenian churches, monasteries, and chapels are in Iran. Iranian Armenia (1502–1828), which includes what is now the Armenian Republic, was part of Qajar Iran up to 1828. Iran had one of the largest populations of Armenians in the world, alongside the neighbouring Ottoman Empire until the beginning of the 20th century.

Armenians were influential and active in modernizing Iran during the 19th and 20th centuries. After the Iranian Revolution, many Armenians emigrated to Armenian diasporic communities in North America and Western Europe. A large number, an estimated 80,000, repatriated to Armenia after the breakup of the Soviet Union with repatriation numbers peaking in the early 2000s. Today, the Armenians are Iran's largest Christian religious minority.

== History ==
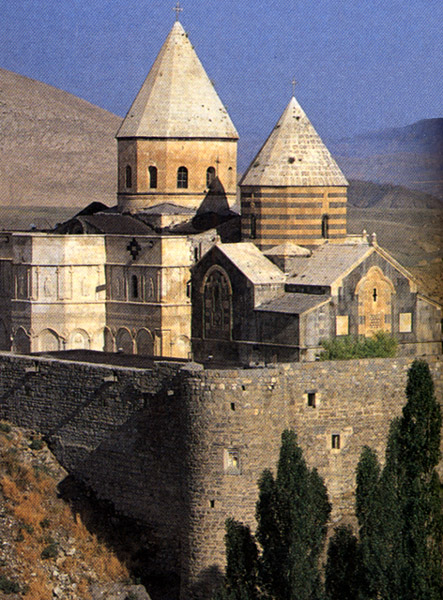
The Armenian St. Thaddeus Monastery, or "Kara Kelissa", West Azerbaijan province, believed by some to have been first built in 66 AD by Saint Jude.

Since Antiquity, there has always been much interaction between ancient Armenia and Persia. The region (or parts of it) has made up part of historical Armenia numerous times in history. These historical Armenian regions that nowadays include Iranian Azerbaijan are Nor Shirakan, Vaspurakan, and Paytakaran. Many of the world's oldest Armenian chapels, monasteries and churches are located within this region of Iran.

On the Behistun Inscription of 515 BC, Darius the Great indirectly confirmed that Urartu and Armenia are synonymous when describing their conquests. Armenia became a satrapy of the Achaemenid for a long time, and relations between Armenians and Persians were cordial.

The cultural links between the Armenians and the Persians can be traced back to Zoroastrian times. Before the 3rd century, no other neighbor had as much influence on Armenian life and culture as Parthia. They shared many religious and cultural characteristics, and intermarriage among the Parthian and Armenian nobility was common. For twelve more centuries, Armenia was under the direct or indirect rule of the Persians.

In the 11th century, the Seljuks drove thousands of Armenians into Iran, where some were sold as slaves and others worked as artisans and merchants. After the Mongol invasion of Persia and Mesopotamia in the 13th century, many Armenian merchants and artists settled in Iran, in cities that were once part of historic Armenia such as Khoy, Salmas, Maku, Maragheh, Urmia, and especially Tabriz.

=== Early modern to late modern era ===
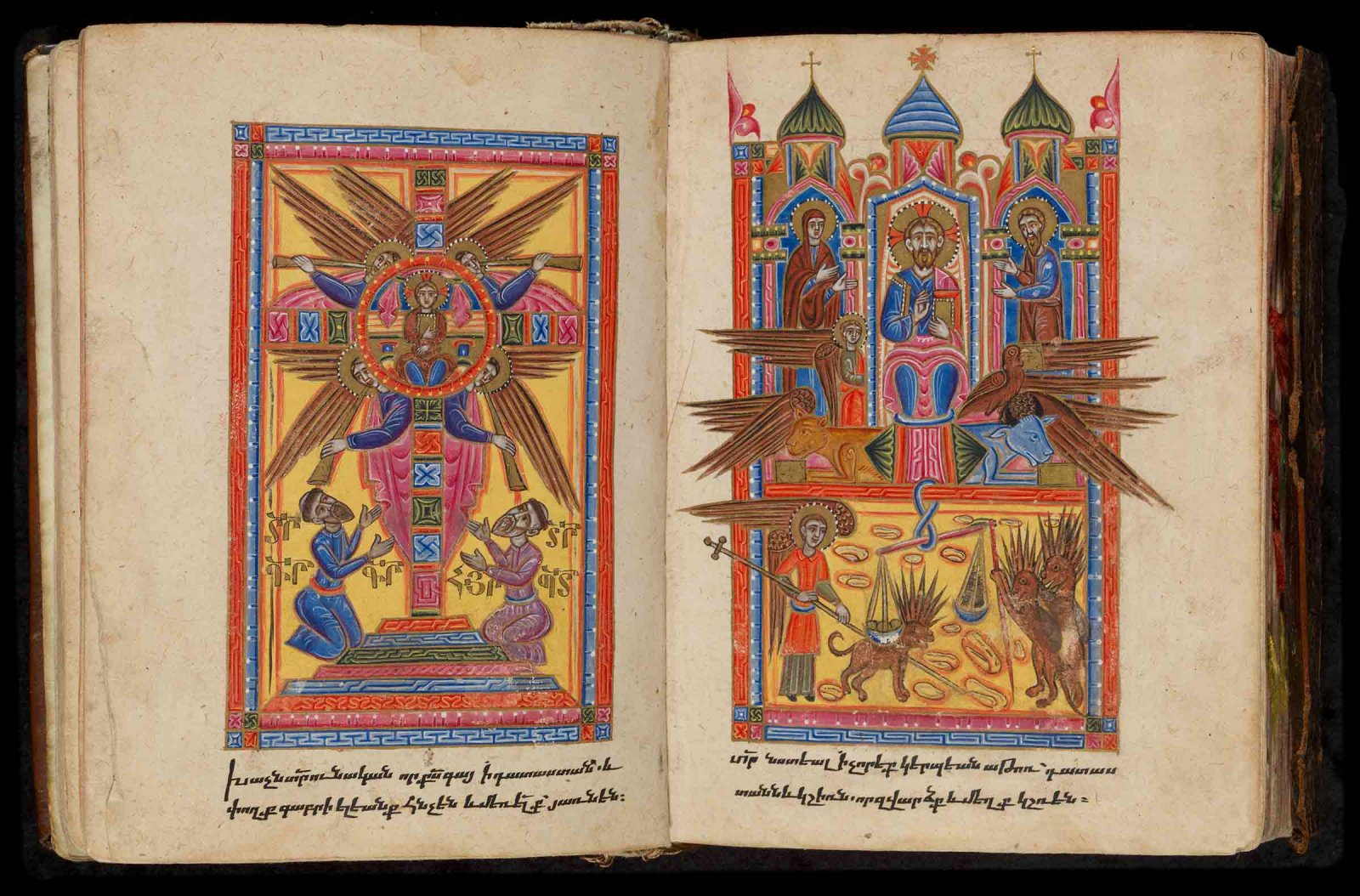
Armenian Gospel Book made in Isfahan in 1655. Chester Beatty Library

Although Armenians have a long history of interaction and settlement with Persia/Iran and within the modern-day borders of the nation, Iran's Armenian community emerged under the Safavids. In the 16th century, the Ottoman Empire and Safavid Iran divided Armenia. From the early 16th century, both Western Armenia and Eastern Armenia fell under Iranian Safavid rule. Owing to the century-long Turco-Iranian geo-political rivalry that would last in Western Asia, significant parts of the region were frequently fought over between the two rival empires. From the mid-16th century with the Peace of Amasya, and decisively from the first half of the 17th century with the Treaty of Zuhab until the first half of the 19th century, Eastern Armenia was ruled by the successive Iranian Safavid, Afsharid and Qajar empires, while Western Armenia remained under Ottoman rule. From 1604 Abbas I of Iran implemented a scorched earth policy in the region to protect his north-western frontier against any invading Ottoman forces, a policy which involved a forced resettlement of masses of Armenians outside of their homelands.

Shah Abbas relocated an estimated 500,000 Armenians from his Armenian lands during the Ottoman–Safavid War of 1603–1618 to an area of Isfahan called New Julfa, which was created to become an Armenian quarter, and to the villages surrounding Isfahan. Iran quickly recognized the Armenians' dexterity in commerce. The community became active in the cultural and economic development of Iran.

Bourvari (Armenian: Բուրւարի) is a collection of villages in Iran between the city of Khomeyn (Markazi province) and Aligudarz (Lorestan province). It was mainly populated by Armenians who were forcibly deported to the region by Shah Abbas of the Safavid Persian Empire during the same as part of Abbas's massive scorched earth resettlement policies within the empire. The villages populated by the Armenians in Bourvari were Dehno, Khorzend, Farajabad, Bahmanabad and Sangesfid.

=== Loss of Eastern Armenia ===
From the late 18th century, an expanding Imperial Russia switched to a more aggressive geo-political stance towards its two neighbors and rivals to the south, namely Iran and the Ottoman Empire. As a result of the Treaty of Gulistan (1813), Qajar Iran was forced to irrevocably cede swaths of its territories in the Caucasus, comprising modern-day Eastern Georgia, Dagestan, and most of the Republic of Azerbaijan. By the Treaty of Turkmenchay (1828), Qajar Iran had to cede the remainder of its Caucasian territories, comprising modern-day Armenia and the remaining part of the contemporary Azerbaijan Republic. The ceding of what is modern-day Armenia (Eastern Armenia in general) in 1828 resulted in a large number of Armenians falling now under the rule of the Russians. Iranian Armenia was thus supplanted by Russian Armenia.

The Treaty of Turkmenchay further stipulated that the Tsar had the right to encourage the resettling of Armenians from Iran into the newly established Russian Armenia. This resulted in a large demographic shift; many of Iran's Armenians followed the call, while many Caucasian Muslims migrated to Iran proper.

Until the mid-fourteenth century, Armenians had constituted a majority in Eastern Armenia. At the close of the fourteenth century, after Timur's campaigns, Islam had become the dominant faith, and Armenians became a minority in Eastern Armenia. In the wake of the Russian invasion of Iran and the subsequent loss of territories, Muslims (Persians, Turkic speakers, and Kurds) constituted some 80% of the population of Iranian Armenia, whereas Christian Armenians constituted a minority of about 20%.

After the Russian administration took hold of Iranian Armenia, the ethnic make-up shifted, and thus for the first time in more than four centuries, ethnic Armenians started to form a majority once again in one part of historic Armenia. The new Russian administration encouraged the settling of ethnic Armenians from Iran proper and Ottoman Turkey. Some 35,000 Muslims out of more than 100,000 emigrated from the region, while some 57,000 Armenians from Iran proper and Turkey arrived after 1828 (see also Russo-Turkish War of 1828–1829). As a result, by 1832, the number of ethnic Armenians had matched that of the Muslims. Not until after the Crimean War and the Russo-Turkish War of 1877–1878, which brought another influx of Turkish Armenians, would ethnic Armenians once again establish a solid majority in Eastern Armenia. Nevertheless, Erivan remained a Muslim-majority city up to the twentieth century. According to the traveller H. F. B. Lynch, the city of Erivan was about 50% Armenian and 50% Muslim (Tatars (Note: The term "Tatars", employed by the Russians, referred to Turkic-speaking Muslims (Shia and Sunni) of Transcaucasia. Unlike Armenians and Georgians, the Tatars did not have their own alphabet and used the Perso-Arabic script. After 1918 with the establishment of the Azerbaijan Democratic Republic, and "especially during the Soviet era", the Tatar group identified itself as "Azerbaijani". Prior to 1918 the word "Azerbaijan" exclusively referred to the Iranian province of Azarbayjan.) i.e. Azeris and Persians) in the early 1890s.

With these events of the first half of the 19th century, and the end of centuries of Iranian rule over Eastern Armenia, a new era had started for the Armenians within the newly established borders of Iran. The Armenians in the recently lost territories north of the Aras river would go through a Russian-dominated period until 1991.

=== Twentieth century up to 1979 ===
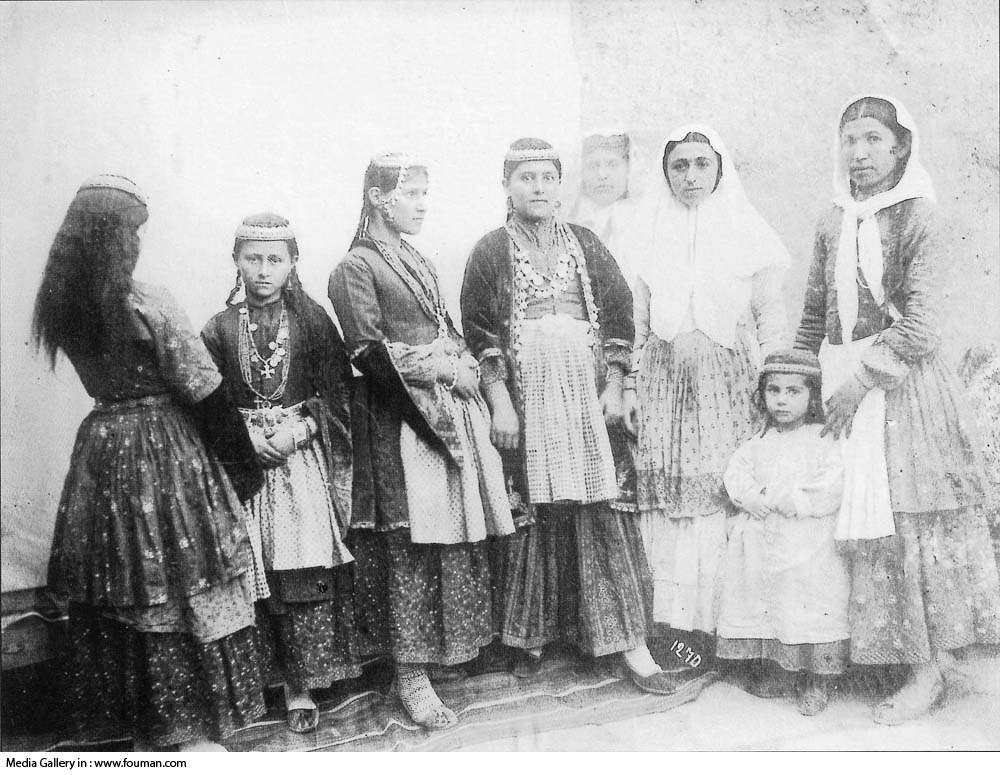
Iranian Armenian women in the Qajar era

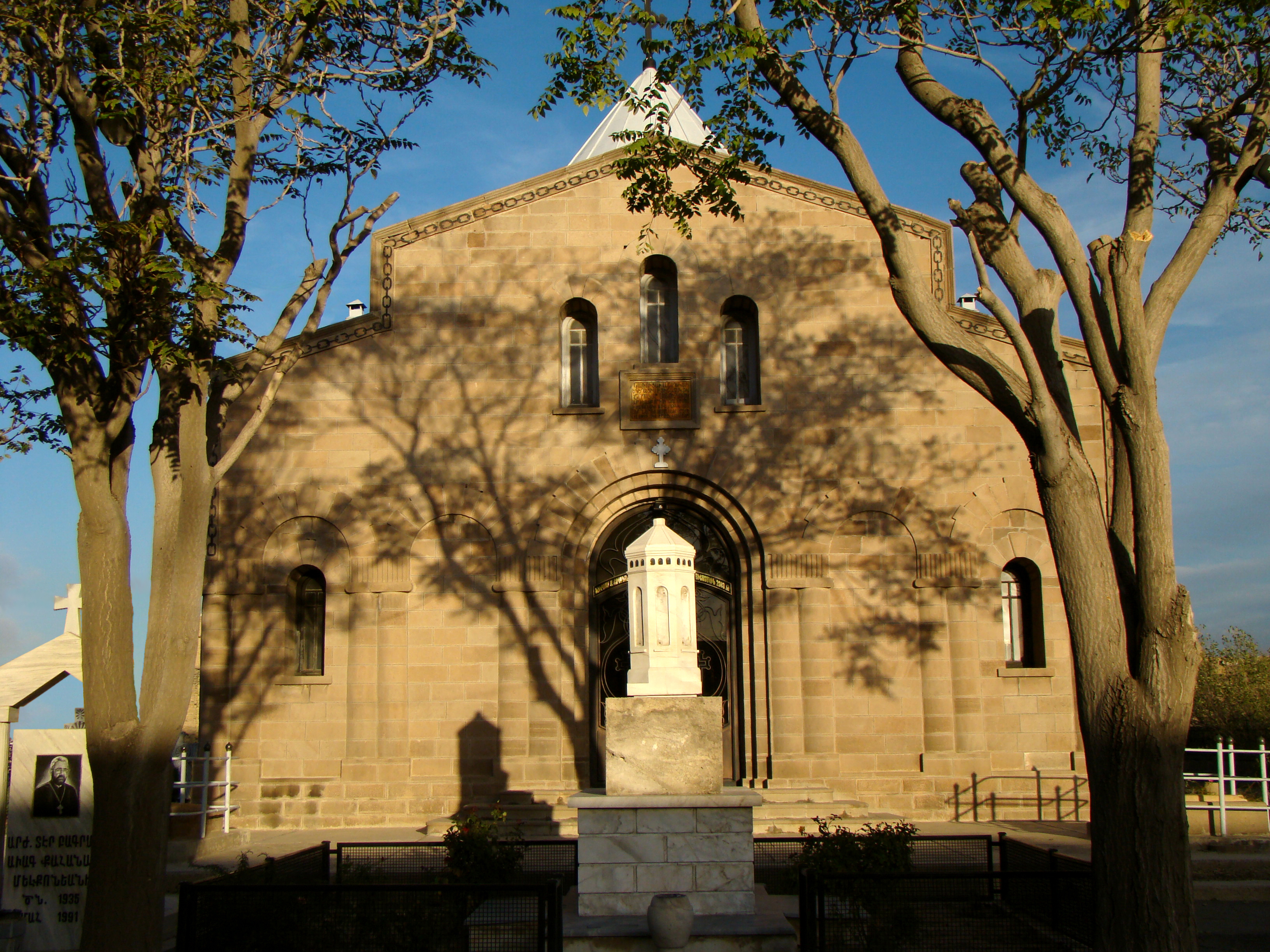
Shoghakat Armenian Church in Tabriz

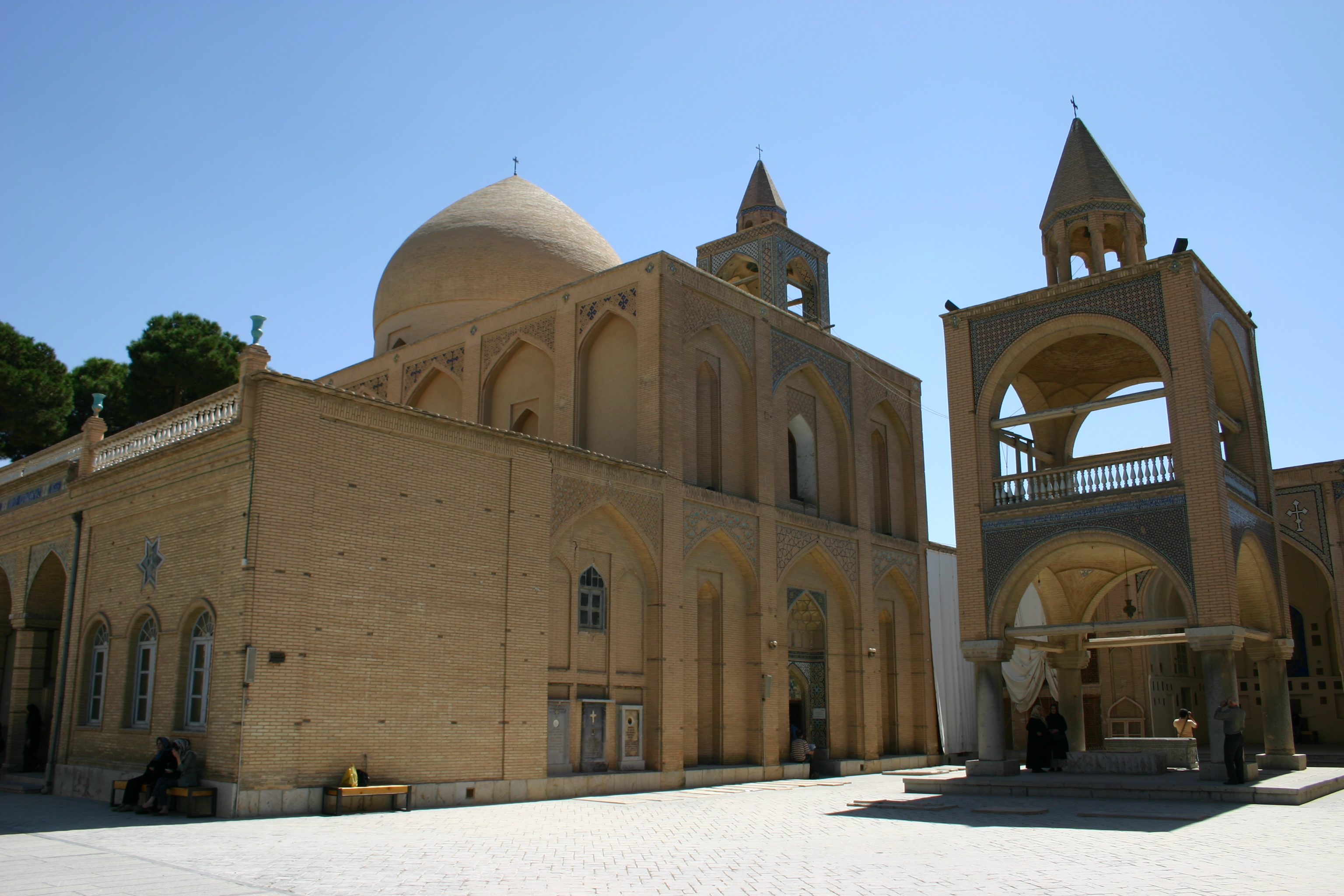
Vank Cathedral in the New Julfa district of Isfahan. One of the oldest of Iran's Armenian churches, built during the Safavid Persian Empire, 1655 – 1664.

The Armenians played a significant role in the development of 20th-century Iran, regarding both its economical as well as its cultural configuration. They were pioneers in photography, theater, and the film industry, and also played a very pivotal role in Iranian political affairs.

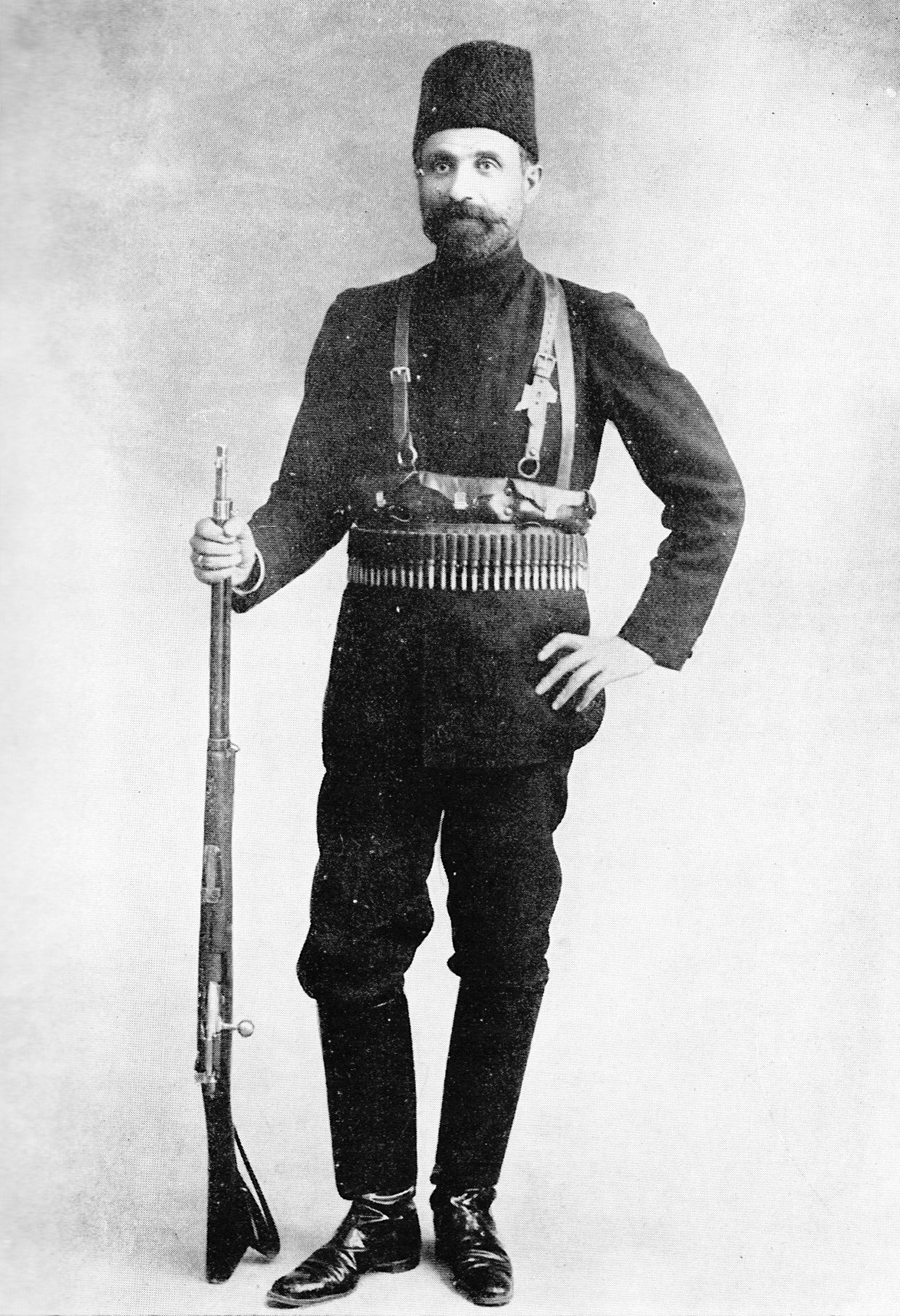
Yeprem Khan was a leading figure in the Constitutional Revolution of Iran

The Revolution of 1905 in Russia had a major effect on northern Iran and, in 1906, Iranian liberals and revolutionaries demanded a constitution in Iran. In 1909 the revolutionaries forced the crown to give up some of its powers. Yeprem Khan, an ethnic Armenian, was an important figure of the Persian Constitutional Revolution.

Armenian Apostolic theologian Malachia Ormanian, in his 1911 book on the Armenian Church, estimated that some 83,400 Armenians lived in Persia, of whom 81,000 were followers of the Apostolic Church, while 2,400 were Armenian Catholics. The Armenian population was distributed in the following regions: 40,400 in Azerbaijan, 31,000 in and around Isfahan, 7,000 in Kurdistan and Lorestan, and 5,000 in Tehran.

During the Armenian genocide, about 50,000 Armenians fled the Ottoman Empire and took refuge in Persia. As a result of the Persian Campaign in northern Iran during World War I, the Ottomans massacred 80,000 Armenians and 30,000 fled to the Russian Empire. The community experienced a political rejuvenation with the arrival of the exiled Dashnak (ARF) leadership from Russian Armenia in mid-1921; approximately 10,000 Armenian ARF party leaders, intellectuals, fighters, and their families crossed the Aras River and took refuge in Qajar Iran. This large influx of Armenians who were affiliated with the ARF also meant that the ARF would ensure its dominance over the other traditional Armenian parties of Persia, and by extension over the entire Iranian Armenian community, which was centered around the Armenian church. Further immigrants and refugees from the Soviet Union numbering nearly 30,000 continued to increase the Armenian community until 1933. Thus by 1930 there were approximately 200,000 Armenians in Iran.

The modernization efforts of Reza Shah (1924–1941) and Mohammad Reza Shah (1941–1979) gave the Armenians ample opportunities for advancement, and Armenians gained important positions in the arts and sciences, economy and services sectors, mainly in Tehran, Tabriz, and Isfahan that became major centers for Armenians. From 1946–1949 about 20,000 Armenians left Iran for the Soviet Union and from 1962–1982 another 25,000 Armenians followed them to Soviet Armenia. By 1979, in the dawn of the Islamic Revolution, an estimated 200,000 – 300,000 Armenians were living in Iran. By 1978, Tehran alone had an Armenian population of 110,000, in part due to migration of Armenian villagers from rural areas of Iran.

Armenian churches, schools, cultural centers, sports clubs and associations flourished and Armenians had their own senator and member of parliament, 300 churches and 500 schools and libraries served the needs of the community.

Armenian presses published numerous books, journals, periodicals, and newspapers, the prominent one being the daily "Alik".

=== After the 1979 Revolution ===
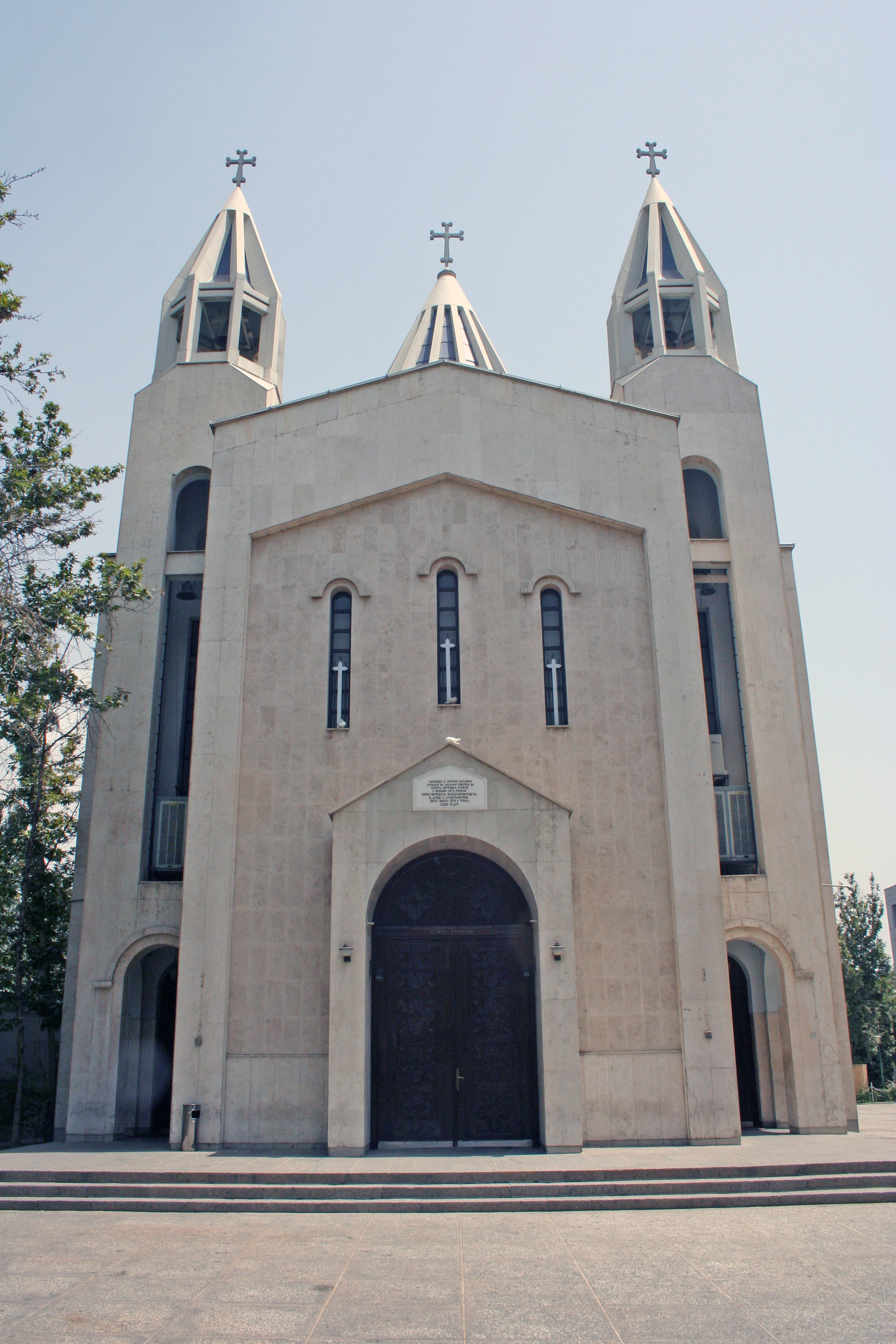
St. Sarkis Cathedral in Tehran. One of Iran's Armenian churches, 1970

Many Armenians served in the Iranian Armed Forces, with 89 killed in action during the Iran–Iraq War. Ayatollah Ali Khamenei has praised the role of Armenians in the war, saying to the Armenian Prime Minister that "Armenian martyrs of the imposed war are like Muslims martyrs and we consider them as honors of Iran".

The fall of the Soviet Union, the common border with Armenia, and the Armeno-Iranian diplomatic and economic agreements have opened a new era for the Iranian Armenians. Iran remains one of Armenia's major trade partners, and the Iranian government has helped ease the hardships of Armenia caused by the blockade imposed by Azerbaijan and Turkey. This includes important consumer products, access to air travel, and energy sources (like petroleum and electricity).

== Current status ==
The Armenians remain the largest religious minority in Iran, and are still the largest Christian community in the country, far ahead of Assyrians. They are appointed two out of the five seats in the Iranian Parliament reserved for religious minorities (more than any other religious minority) and are the only minority with official observing status in the Guardian and Expediency Discernment Councils. Half of Iran's Armenians live in the Tehran area (where they have been established since at least the Safavid era), most notably in its suburbs of Narmak, Majidiyeh, Nadershah, etc. A quarter live in Isfahan, and the other quarter is concentrated in Northwestern Iran or Iranian Azerbaijan.

== Distribution ==
In 387 AD when the Sasanian Empire and the Byzantine Empire split Armenia, the historically Armenian areas of Nor Shirakan, Paytakaran, and the eastern half of Vaspurakan were ceded to the Persians, these territories comprise the western and northern regions of Azerbaijan. Following the Russo-Persian War (1826–28) about 40,000 Armenians left Azerbaijan and resettled in newly established Russian Armenia.

The area retained a large Armenian population until 1914 when World War I began and Azerbaijan was invaded by the Ottomans who slaughtered much of the local Armenian population. Prior to the Ottoman invasion there were about 150,000 Armenians in Azerbaijan, and 30,000 of them were in Tabriz. About 80,000 were massacred, 30,000 fled to Russian Armenia, and the other 10,000 fled the area of the modern West Azerbaijan Province and took refuge among the Armenians of Tabriz. After the war ended in 1918 the 10,000 refugees in Tabriz returned to their villages, but many resettled in Soviet Armenia from 1947 up until the early 80s. Currently, about 4,000 Armenians remain in the countryside of East Azerbaijan and about 2,000 remain in Tabriz living in the districts of Nowbar, Bazar, and Ahrab owning 4 churches, a school and a cemetery.

This is a list of previously or currently Armenian inhabited settlements:

- Maku (Շավարշան / Shavarshan or Արտազ / Artaz (hy) in Armenian) now in Maku and Chalderan counties in West Azerbaijan Province:
  - Maku, Qareh-Kelisa, Avajiq, Siah Cheshmeh, Shaveran, Sadal and Baron (Dzor Dzor).
- Khoy (Հեր / Her in Armenian) now in Khoy and Chaypareh (Avarayr Plain) counties in West Azerbaijan Province:
  - Khoy, Mahlazan, Ghris, Fanai, Dizeh, Qotur, Chors, Var, Quruq, Shurab, Qarajelu, Qareh Shaban and Saidabad.
- Salmas (Սալմաստ / Salmast or Սաղամաստ / Saghamast in Armenian) now in Salmas County in West Azerbaijan Province:
  - Salmast, Kohneshahr, Akhtekhaneh (fa), Aslanik, Charik, Drishk, Qalasar, Qezeljeh, Haftvan (fa), Khosrowabad (fa) (fa), Goluzan, Malham (fa), Sheitanabad, Payajuk (fa), Karabulagh, Vardan (fa), Hodar, Malham (fa) (fa), Saramelik, Sarna (fa), Savera (hy), Zivajik, Kojamish and Ula.
- Urmia (Ուրմիա / Urmia or Ուռմի / Urmi in Armenian) now in Urmia County in West Azerbaijan Province:
  - Urmia, Balanej, Badelbo, Surmanabad, Jamalabad, Gardabad, Ikiaghaj, Isalu, Karaguz, Nakhichevan Tepe, Reihanabad, Sepurghan, Karabagh, Adeh, Dizej Ala, Khan Babakhan, Kachilan, Shirabad, Charbakhsh, Chahar Gushan, Ballu, Darbarud, ِDigala (fa), Kukia and Babarud.
- Julfa (Ջուղա / Jugha in Armenian):
  - Upper Darashamb, Middle Darashamb and Lower Darashamb.
- Arasbaran (Պարսպատունիք / Parspatunik (hy) or Ղարադաղ / Gharadagh (hy) in Armenian) now in Julfa, Khoda Afarin, Varzaqan, Ahar and Kaleybar counties in East Azerbaijan Province:
  - Dizmar (West, Central and East):
    - Aghaghan, Khaneqah, Qeshlaq, Yurgiutiun, Sardu (hy), Owli.
  - Mishepara:
    - Nepesht, Mikidi, Aghayi, Balan, Berd, Qasmushen, Garmanab.
  - Mnjivan:
    - Vinaq, Aynalu, Sevahogh, Vardanashen, Karaglukh, Keshish Qeshlaq, Abbasabad, Norashen, Mzget, Luma, Vayqan.
  - Keivan:
    - Siran, Avanlu, Qalamlu, Avarsin, Asran, Ashraf, Seqin, Dogidara, Sohran.
  - Hagar:
    - Abella, Amredul.
- Tabriz (Թավրիզ / Tavriz or Թաւրէժ / Tavrezh in Armenian) now in Tabriz County in East Azerbaijan Province:
  - Tabriz, Mujumbar, Sohrol, Aljamolk and Minavar.
- Ardabil (Արտավիլ / Artavil or Արտավետ / Artavet in Armenian)
- Maragheh (Մարաղա / Maragha in Armenian)
- Miandoab:
  - Taqiabad

=== Tabriz ===
Traditionally, Tabriz where Armenian political life was vibrant starting from the early modern (Safavid) era. After the ceding large areas of territories to Russia in the first quarter of the 19th century, the independent position of the Tabrizi Armenians was strengthened, as they gained immunities and concessions from Abbas Mirza. The importance of the Tabrizi Armenians also grew with the transfer of the bishop's seat from St.Taddeus (or Qara Kelissa) near Salmas to Tabriz in 1845. Tabriz has an Arajnordaran, three Armenian Churches (St. Sargis, Shoghakat, and St. Mary), a chapel (fa), a school, Ararat Cultural Club and an Armenian cemetery (fa) (fa).

==== Notable Armenians from Tabriz ====
Pre-Pahlavi period (pre-1925)

- Arakel of Tabriz, historian
- Arshi, poet
- Mohammad Beg, statesman
- William Cormick, physician (half Armenian)
- Hayk Bzhishkyan, Soviet military commander (half Armenian)
- Ardashes Badmagrian, movie theater owner
- Hambarsoom Grigorian, composer
- Vartan Hovanessian, architect
- Ivan Galamian, violin teacher
- Gegham Saryan, poet and translator
- Vahan Papazian, political activist and community leader
- Avetis Nazarbekian, poet, journalist, political activist and revolutionary
- Louise Aslanian, writer and figure in the French Resistance

Pahlavi and post-Pahlavi period (post-1925)

- Hakob Karapents, author
- Alexander Abian, mathematician
- Varto Terian, Iran's first stage actress of theater and educator
- Samuel Khachikian, film director, screenwriter, author, and film editor
- Arman (actor), actor, film director, producer
- Robert Ekhart, film director (half Armenian)
- Emik Avakian, inventor
- Khachik Babayan, violin player
- Grigor Vahramian Gasparbeg, painter
- Vartan Vahramian, composer, artist, and painter
- Vartan Gregorian, academic
- Vartan Hovanessian, architect
- Rouben Galichian, scholar
- Henry D. Sahakian, businessman

=== Central Iran ===
List of Armenian villages in central Iran:

- Kharaqan (hy) (Ղարաղան / Gharaghan in Armenian) now in Zarandieh County in Markazi Province:
  - Upper Chanakhchi, Lar, Charhad and Lower Chanakhchi.
- Hamadan:
  - Hamadan and Sheverin.
- Malayer:
  - Anuch, Deh Chaneh and Qaleh Fattahieh.
- Kazaz (Kiazaz in Armenian) now in Shazand County in Markazi Province:
  - Shazand (fa) (fa) (fa), Abbasabad, Gurezar (fa) and Anbarteh.
- Kamareh (Kiamara in Armenian) now in Khomeyn County in Markazi Province:
  - Lilian (fa), Qurchibash (fa), Chartagh, Davudabad, Kandha, Darreh Shur, Mazra, Saki, Ortachiman, Asadabad, Danian, Farajabad, Hajiabad, Nasrabad, Kajarestan and Mazraeh Qasem.
- Borborud (Բուրւարի / Bourvari in Armenian) now in Aligudarz County in Lorestan Province:
  - Shapurabad, Khorzand, Parmishan, Pahra, Sang-e Sefid, Bahramabad, Dehnow, Qareh Kahriz, Nasrabad, Goran, Jowz, Cherbas, Jahan Khosh and Anuj.
- Japloq (hy) (Գյափլա / Giapla in Armenian) now in Azna County in Lorestan Province and Shazand County in Markazi Province:
  - Azna, Ahmadabad, Bosnava, Berk, Perchestan, Marzian, Qataat, Gorji, Kamian, Masoudabad, Abbasabad, Bamian, Bagh Muri, Zarna, Tokhmar and Sharafabad.
- Faridan (Փերիա / Peria in Armenian) now in Faridan, Buin & Miandasht and Fereydunshahr counties in Isfahan Province:
  - Zarneh (Boloran), Upper Khoygan, Nemagerd, Gharghan, Sangbaran, Hezar Jarib, Singerd, Lower Khoygan, Adegan, Chigan, Hadan, Milagerd, Sureshgan, Savaran, Chigan, Derakhtak, Punestan, Qaleh Khajeh, Aznavleh, Bijgerd, Khong (now part of town of Fereydunshahr), Moghandar, Qalamelik, Nanadegan and Darreh Bid.
- Karvan, now in Tiran & Karvan County in Isfahan Province:
  - Taqiabad, Dowlatabad and Upper Kord.
- Lenjan and Alenjan, now in Lenjan, Falavarjan and Mobarakeh counties in Isfahan Province:
  - Khansarak, Kelisan, Mehregan, Pelart, Semsan, Kaleh Masih, Garkan, Zudan, Barchan, Jushan, Bondart, Koruj, Zazeran, Kapashan and Mamad.
- Charmahal (hy) or Gandoman now in Borujen, Kiar, Lordegan and Shahr-e Kord counties in Chaharmahal and Bakhtiari Province:
  - Vastegan (fa), Geshnigan (fa), Shalamzar, Gandoman, Sirak (fa), Boldaji (fa), Azan (fa), Galugerd (fa), Konarak (fa), Aqbolagh (fa) (fa), Sinagan (fa), Mamura (fa), Mamuka (fa) (fa), Sulugan, Gushki (fa), Ferendigan, Hajiabad (fa), Ahmadabad, Livasian (fa) and Zorigan.

The settlements of Lenjan, Alenjan and Karvan were abandoned in the 18th century.

The other settlements depopulated in the middle of the 20th century due to emigration to New Julfa, Teheran or Soviet Armenia (in 1945 and later in 1967). Currently only 1 village (Zarneh) in Peria is totally, and 4 other villages (Upper Khoygan, Gharghan, Nemagerd and Sangbaran) in Peria and 1 village (Upper Chanakhchi) in Gharaghan are partially settled by Armenians.

Other than these settlements there is an Armenian village near Gorgan (Qoroq) which is settled by Armenians recently moved from Soviet territory.

== Culture ==
In addition to having their own churches and clubs, Armenians of Iran are one of the few linguistic minorities in Iran with their own schools. Armenians are exempt from national laws barring alcohol consumption and public gender relations in Armenian 'public' spaces, where Muslim citizens are not permitted to enter.

== Iranian Armenian dialect ==
New Jugha
- Iranian Armenian, New Julfa, Persian Armenian
- Նոր Ջուղայի բարբառ
- Native to: Iran
- Region: New Julfa
- Ethnicity: Armenians
- Language family: Indo-European: Armenian; Eastern; New Jugha
- Writing system: Armenian alphabet

Language codes
- ISO 639-3: (included in Western Armenian [hyw])
- Glottolog: jolf1238

The Armenian language used in Iran holds a unique position in the usage of Armenian in the world, as most Armenians in the Diaspora use Western Armenian. However, Iranian Armenians speak an Eastern Armenian dialect that is very close to that used in Armenia, Georgia, and Russia. Iranian Armenians speak this dialect due in part to the fact that in 1604 much of the Armenian population in Nakhchivan, which used the eastern dialect, was displaced and sent to Isfahan by Shah Abbas. This also allowed for an older version to be preserved which uses classical Armenian orthography known as "Mashtotsian orthography" and spelling, whereas almost all other Eastern Armenian users (especially in the former Soviet Union) have adopted the reformed Armenian orthography which was applied in Soviet Armenia in the 1920s and continues in the present Republic of Armenia. This makes the Armenian language used in Iran and in the Armenian-Iranian media and publications unique, applying elements of both major Armenian language branches (pronunciation, grammar and language structure of Eastern Armenian and the spelling system of Western Armenian).

The Armenian dialects of Iran are referred to collectively in Armenian as Persian Armenian or Parskahayeren (պարսկահայերէն, պարսկահայերեն), or less commonly as Iranian Armenian or Iranahayeren (իրանահայերէն, իրանահայերեն). The modern koine spoken in Tehran serves as the prestige dialect, although many historic varieties existed in Iranian Azerbaijan, Central Iran, Isfahan province, the New Julfa district in Isfahan, Kurdistan, Khorasan, and Khuzestan, some of which have persisted in their respective communities. Iranian Armenian dialects are distinguished phonologically from other Eastern Armenian varieties by the widespread pronunciation of the retroflex approximant ⟨ɻ⟩ for ր, which sounds similar to the American English alveolar approximant ⟨ɹ⟩, while Armenian dialects outside of Iran pronounce it as a flap ⟨ɾ⟩. Many dialects also use a low front vowel as a marginal phoneme ⟨æ⟩, primarily in loanwords from Persian, but also in some native Armenian words such as mæt "one; a bit; for a moment" from մի հատ mi hat. There are also many calques from Persian, particularly in cultural phraseology and in compound verbs (e.g. պատճառ ելնել patčaṙ elnel from باعث شدن bā'es šodan “to result in; to cause”).

== See also ==
- Armenia–Iran relations, Satrapy of Armenia, Battle of Avarayr, Persian Armenia, Marzpanate Armenia, Arsacid dynasty of Armenia, Armenians in the Persianate, Iranian Armenia
- Ethnic minorities in Iran, Christians in Iran
- List of Armenian churches in Iran
- Monasteries: Monastery of St. Thaddeus, Monastery of St. Stephen the Protomartyr
- Cathedrals: Holy Mother of God Cathedral, All Saviour's Cathedral, St. Sarkis Cathedral
- List of Iranian Armenians
- Media: Alik, Arax, Hooys
- Sports: Ararat Football Club, Ararat Basketball Club, Ararat Stadium, Pan-Armenian Games
- Politics: Armenian Revolutionary Federation in Iran
- Art: Lilihan carpets and rugs

== Sources ==
- Bournoutian, George A. (1980). "The Population of Persian Armenia Prior to and Immediately Following its Annexation to the Russian Empire: 1826–1832". The Wilson Center, Kennan Institute for Advanced Russian Studies.
- Yves Bomati and Houchang Nahavandi,Shah Abbas, Emperor of Persia,1587–1629, 2017, ed. Ketab Corporation, Los Angeles, ISBN 978-1595845672, English translation by Azizeh Azodi.
- Amurian, A.; Kasheff, M. (1986). "ARMENIANS OF MODERN IRAN". Encyclopaedia Iranica.
- Berberian, Houri (2008). "ARMENIA ii. ARMENIAN WOMEN IN THE LATE 19TH- AND EARLY 20TH-CENTURY PERSIA". Encyclopaedia Iranica.
- Fisher, William Bayne; Avery, P.; Hambly, G. R. G; Melville, C. (1991). The Cambridge History of Iran. Vol. 7. Cambridge: Cambridge University Press. ISBN 0521200954.
- Kettenhofen, Erich; Bournoutian, George A.; Hewsen, Robert H. (1998). "EREVAN". Encyclopaedia Iranica, Vol. VIII, Fasc. 5. pp. 542–551.
