= Qaraguz =

Qaraguz (Persian: قراگوز) or Qareh Guz (قره گوز), may refer to:

- Qaraguz-e Hajji Baba
- Qaraguz-e Il
- Qaraguz-e Salimaqa
