= Zeynalu =

Zeynalu (Persian: زينالو) may refer to:

- Zeynalu, Shahin Dezh
- Zeynalu, Urmia
