= Valindeh =

Valindeh (Persian: ولينده), also rendered as Valendeh may refer to:

- Valindeh-ye Olya
- Valindeh-ye Sofla
