= Anhar =

Anhar (Persian: انهر) may refer to:

== Places in Iran ==
- Anhar-e Olya
- Anhar-e Sofla
- Anhar, a village to the northwest of Urmia

== Religion ==
- Anhar, the wife of John the Baptist in Mandaeism
