= Qarah Hasanlu =

Qarah Hasanlu or Qareh Hasanlu (Persian: قره حسنلو) may refer to:

- Qarah Hasanlu, Ardabil
- Qarah Hasanlu, West Azerbaijan
- Qarah Hasanlu-ye Khvajeh Pasha, West Azerbaijan Province
