= Davudabad (disambiguation) =

Davudabad is a city in Markazi Province, Iran

Davudabad (Persian: داودآباد) may also refer to:

- Davudabad, Khuzestan
- Davudabad, Kohgiluyeh and Boyer-Ahmad
- Davudabad, Khomeyn, Markazi Province
- Davudabad, Tehran
- Davudabad, West Azerbaijan
