= Hambarsoom Grigorian =

Iranian Armenian composer and conductor (1893–1975)

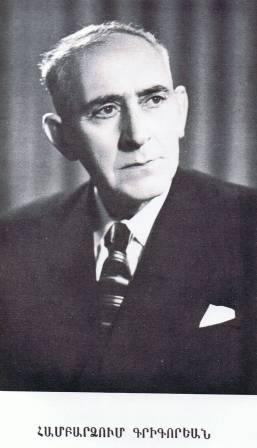
Hambarsoom Grigorian, 1893–1975

Hambarsoom Grigorian (Armenian: Համբարձում Գրիգորի Գրիգորյան; 9 May 1893 – 28 July 1975) was an Iranian Armenian composer, music educator and choral conductor. He founded the Komitas Choir in Tehran in 1928 and directed it until 1969. A family-published collection of his music gives his date of death as 28 July 1975, while a contemporary condolence notice in Alik independently confirms that he had died by 16 August 1975.

== Life and career ==
Grigorian was born in Tabriz on 9 May 1893. He graduated from the diocesan central school of Atrpatakan in 1913 and taught at the Armenian national school in Qazvin until 1923. From 1923 to 1927 he studied at the Schola Cantorum de Paris, where he was a pupil of Vincent d'Indy. He then resumed his musical and educational work in Rasht and later in Tehran.

A 1937 Alik profile reported that Grigorian received his first musical instruction from his relative Levon Grigorian and played the flute. According to the profile, he also took private music-theory lessons from a Russian musicologist in Prague, on whose advice he subsequently went to Paris. A 2010 Persian-language profile in Hooys more specifically identified Levon (rendered "Leon" in that source) as Grigorian's brother and reported that Grigorian studied psychology and pedagogy at the Sorbonne while pursuing his music studies in Paris. A 2011 retrospective likewise listed Hambarsoom, Adam and Rubik Grigorian among the musicians trained by Levon.

Grigorian established the Komitas Choir in Tehran in 1928. The Armenian Soviet Encyclopedia credits him with more than 200 Armenian songs, choral works and dance songs, as well as works described as Eastern or Persian sketches. In 1935, Alik reported a Komitas Choir concert under his direction. A later concert that year included his composition Siro yerge (Song of Love) and two Iranian pieces that he had arranged; the reviewer characterized the program as contributing to Iranian–Armenian cultural rapprochement. In 1937, the Armenian Church-Loving Women's Union publicly thanked him for sustaining Armenian song in the community and introducing audiences to the folk works collected by Komitas. The choir also sang liturgical music; a 1962 notice announced that it would sing the Divine Liturgy at St. Gregory the Illuminator Church under Grigorian's direction.

On 9 October 1969, a jubilee in Tehran marked 55 years of Grigorian's cultural work and 40 years of the Komitas Choir. Archbishop Artak Manoukian presented him with a Komitas medal. Speakers credited the choir with bringing Armenian song to audiences in Tabriz, Tehran, Isfahan, Shiraz and Abadan, as well as to the annual pilgrimage at St. Thaddeus Monastery. The program included Grigorian's To My Birthplace, dedicated to Tabriz and performed in Armenian and Persian.

== Public and cultural activity ==
Grigorian was active in Iranian Armenian publishing and community affairs. A 2001 Alik retrospective identified him as one of the editors of the Armenian periodical Loys, together with Hovsep Tadevosian and Tachat Poghosian. In its account of its own 80-year history, Alik named him among the group that decided to establish the newspaper and laid its foundation.

An official 1964 notice listed Grigorian among those elected to a three-year term in the Tehran Armenian Diocesan Representative Assembly. That year he also announced a donation of 1,000 rials to the Kushesh-Davtian Armenian boys' elementary school in place of celebrating his name day.

== Legacy ==
Grigorian's setting of Aram Garone's poem Mi sirir el indz (Do Not Love Me Anymore) was performed at a memorial program for the poet in March 1975. In 1977, the Kushesh school thanked Shoghik Grigorian for donating 400 books from Hambarsoom Grigorian's personal library.

The Armenian tenor Hovhannes Badalyan worked in the Komitas Choir under Grigorian while living in Iran. Grigorian's compositions have continued to be performed and recorded. The Komitas Choir performed his Hayreniki kanche (Call of the Homeland) at an Armenian book exhibition in Tehran in 2012, and songs by Grigorian appeared on Anna Mayilyan's album You Came Again, recorded from the composers' original printed scores.
