= Armatlu =

Armatlu (Persian: ارمتلو) may refer to:

- Armatlu, East Azerbaijan
- Armatlu, North Khorasan
