= 1863 in Iran =

- Decades
- See also: Other events of 1863; Years in Iran

The following lists events that happened during 1863 in Qajar era.

== Incumbents ==
- Monarch: Naser al-Din Shah Qajar

== Births ==
- January 27 – Mahmoud Alamir, Iranian politician and diplomat.
- April 1 – Abolqasem Naser ol-Molk, Iranian politician.
- August 18 – Khazʽal Ibn Jabir, Sheikh of Mohammerah.
- December 13 – Abdulkhalig Akhundov, Azerbaijani physician, writer and publisher.
- ? – Amanollah Khan Zia' os-Soltan, Iranian aristocrat and politician.
- ? – Ardashes Badmagrian.
- ? – Ashraf os-Saltaneh, Persian Qajar member of court, journalist and photographer.
- ? – Mehdi Qoli Hedayat, Prime Minister of Iran.
- ? – Sadegh Sadegh, Iranian politician.
