= Bozlu =

Bozlu may refer to:

- Bozlu, Iran
- Bozlu, Kalbajar
- Bozlu, Lachin
