= Isalu =

Isalu عیسی‌لو
- Village
- Location within Iran
- Coordinates: 37°22′01″N 45°14′29″E
- Country: Iran
- Province: West Azerbaijan
- County: Urmia
- Bakhsh: Central
- Rural District: Baranduzchay-ye Jonubi

Population (2006)
  - Total: 70
- Time zone: UTC+3:30 (IRST)
  - Summer (DST): UTC+4:30 (IRDT)

Isalu (Persian: عیسی‌لو, romanized: ‘Īsālū) is a village in Baranduzchay-ye Jonubi Rural District, in the Central District of Urmia County, West Azerbaijan Province, Iran. At the 2006 census, its population was 70, in 21 families.

The village has at least one Armenian church.

== Bibliography ==
- Amurian, Andre; Kasheff, Manouchehr (1986). "ARMENIANS OF MODERN IRAN". In Yarshater, Ehsan (ed.). Encyclopædia Iranica (Online ed.). Encyclopædia Iranica Foundation.
