= Qasemlu, West Azerbaijan =

Village in West Azerbaijan province, Iran

Qasemlu Persian: قاسملو
- Village
- Location within Iran
- Coordinates: 37°20′46″N 45°09′04″E
- Country: Iran
- Province: West Azerbaijan
- County: Urmia
- District: Central
- Rural District: Baranduzchay-ye Jonubi

Population (2016)
  - Total: 479
- Time zone: UTC+3:30 (IRST)

Qasemlu (Persian: قاسملو) (Note: Also romanized as Qāsemlū; in Armenian: Ղասըմլու) is a village in Baranduzchay-ye Jonubi Rural District of the Central District in Urmia County, West Azerbaijan province, Iran.

== Demographics ==
=== Population ===
At the time of the 2006 National Census, the village's population was 447 in 93 households. The following census in 2011 counted 374 people in 96 households. The 2016 census measured the population of the village as 479 people in 143 households.
