= Tumatar =

Village in West Azerbaijan province, Iran

Tumatar Persian: تومتر
- Village
- Location within Iran
- Coordinates: 37°22′47″N 45°09′32″E
- Country: Iran
- Province: West Azerbaijan
- County: Urmia
- District: Central
- Rural District: Baranduzchay-ye Jonubi

Population (2016)
  - Total: 635
- Time zone: UTC+3:30 (IRST)

Tumatar (Persian: تومتر, romanized: Tūmatar) (Note: Also known as Toumatar.) is a village in Baranduzchay-ye Jonubi Rural District of the Central District in Urmia County, West Azerbaijan province, Iran. The village has at least one Armenian church.

== History ==
Prior to the First World War, there were 20 Assyrian houses at Tumatar, as per the list presented by Agha Petros to the Lausanne Peace Conference in 1922.

== Demographics ==
=== Population ===
At the time of the 2006 National Census, the village's population was 685 in 189 households. The following census in 2011 counted 448 people in 155 households. The 2016 census measured the population of the village as 635 people in 203 households.

== Bibliography ==
- Amurian, Andre; Kasheff, Manouchehr (1986). "ARMENIANS OF MODERN IRAN". In Yarshater, Ehsan (ed.). Encyclopædia Iranica (Online ed.). Encyclopædia Iranica Foundation.
- Gaunt, David (2006). Massacres, Resistance, Protectors: Muslim-Christian Relations in Eastern Anatolia during World War I. Gorgias Press.
