= Qezel Asheq =

Village in West Azerbaijan province, Iran

Qezel Asheq Persian: قزل عاشق
- Village
- Location within Iran
- Coordinates: 37°36′54″N 45°03′20″E
- Country: Iran
- Province: West Azerbaijan
- County: Urmia
- District: Central
- Rural District: Rowzeh Chay

Population (2016)
  - Total: 4,561
- Time zone: UTC+3:30 (IRST)

Qezel Asheq (Persian: قزل عاشق, romanized: Qezel ‘Āsheq; Syriac: Qīzīlʿāshīq) (Note: Also known as Kizlachouk.) is a village in Rowzeh Chay Rural District of the Central District in Urmia County, West Azerbaijan province, Iran.

== History ==
Qīzīlʿāshīq was inhabited by 40 Church of the East Christian families in 1862 and was served by the Church of Mār Giwārgīs and 1 priest, according to the Russian archimandrite Sophoniah. At this time, the priest Paul of Qīzīlʿāshīq also cared for the village of Yāghmūralūi. There were 22 Church of the East Christian families at Qīzīlʿāshīq with 1 church and 1 priest in 1877, as per Edward Lewes Cutts. Prior to the First World War, there were 100 Assyrian houses at Qīzīlʿāshīq, as per the list presented by Agha Petros to the Lausanne Peace Conference in 1922. It was located in the Anzel District.

== Demographics ==
=== Population ===
At the time of the 2006 National Census, the village's population was 2,877 in 696 households. The following census in 2011 counted 3,621 people in 977 households. The 2016 census measured the population of the village as 4,561 people in 1,261 households.

== Bibliography ==
- Gaunt, David (2006). Massacres, Resistance, Protectors: Muslim-Christian Relations in Eastern Anatolia during World War I. Gorgias Press.
- Wilmshurst, David (2000). The Ecclesiastical Organisation of the Church of the East, 1318–1913 (PDF). Peeters Publishers.
