= Badaki, Urmia =

Village in West Azerbaijan province, Iran

Badaki Persian: بادکی
- Village
- Location within Iran
- Coordinates: 37°35′02″N 45°01′35″E
- Country: Iran
- Province: West Azerbaijan
- County: Urmia
- District: Central
- Rural District: Rowzeh Chay

Population (2016)
  - Total: 6,959
- Time zone: UTC+3:30 (IRST)

Badaki (Persian: بادکی) (Note: Also romanized as Bādakī) is a village in Rowzeh Chay Rural District of the Central District in Urmia County, West Azerbaijan province, Iran.

== Demographics ==
=== Population ===
At the time of the 2006 National Census, the village's population was 252 in 63 households. The following census in 2011 counted 1,169 people in 276 households. The 2016 census measured the population of the village as 6,959 people in 1,723 households.
