= Mobarakabad, West Azerbaijan =

Village in West Azerbaijan province, Iran

Mobarakabad Persian: مبارک‌آباد
- Village
- Location within Iran
- Coordinates: 37°22′42″N 45°06′47″E
- Country: Iran
- Province: West Azerbaijan
- County: Urmia
- District: Central
- Rural District: Baranduzchay-ye Jonubi

Population (2016)
  - Total: 619
- Time zone: UTC+3:30 (IRST)

Mobarakabad (Persian: مبارک‌آباد) (Note: Also romanized as Mobārakābād; also known as Bazmūtār (بزموتار) and Būzbūtābād (بوزبوت اباد)) is a village in Baranduzchay-ye Jonubi Rural District of the Central District in Urmia County, West Azerbaijan province, Iran.

== Demographics ==
=== Population ===
At the time of the 2006 National Census, the village's population was 543 in 105 households. The following census in 2011 counted 514 people in 135 households. The 2016 census measured the population of the village as 619 people in 157 households.
