= Mahmudabad, Urmia =

Village in West Azerbaijan province, Iran

Mahmudabad Persian: محموداباد
- Village
- Location within Iran
- Coordinates: 37°21′58″N 45°07′51″E
- Country: Iran
- Province: West Azerbaijan
- County: Urmia
- District: Central
- Rural District: Baranduzchay-ye Jonubi

Population (2016)
  - Total: 711
- Time zone: UTC+3:30 (IRST)

Mahmudabad (Persian: محموداباد) (Note: Also romanized as Maḩmūdābād; also known as Qāzān Tappeh) is a village in Baranduzchay-ye Jonubi Rural District of the Central District in Urmia County, West Azerbaijan province, Iran.

== Demographics ==
=== Population ===
At the time of the 2006 National Census, the village's population was 649 in 136 households. The following census in 2011 counted 524 people in 134 households. The 2016 census measured the population of the village as 711 people in 184 households.
