= Jehatlu =

Village in West Azerbaijan province, Iran

Jehatlu Persian: جهتلو
- Village
- Location within Iran
- Coordinates: 37°35′50″N 45°01′44″E
- Country: Iran
- Province: West Azerbaijan
- County: Urmia
- District: Central
- Rural District: Rowzeh Chay

Population (2016)
  - Total: 906
- Time zone: UTC+3:30 (IRST)

Jehatlu (Persian: جهتلو) (Note: Also romanized as Jehatlū) is a village in Rowzeh Chay Rural District of the Central District in Urmia County, West Azerbaijan province, Iran.

== Demographics ==
=== Population ===
At the time of the 2006 National Census, the village's population was 609 in 142 households. The following census in 2011 counted 623 people in 178 households. The 2016 census measured the population of the village as 906 people in 254 households.
