= Darin Qaleh =

Village in West Azerbaijan province, Iran

Darin Qaleh Persian: درين قلعه
- Village
- Location within Iran
- Coordinates: 37°19′30″N 45°07′22″E
- Country: Iran
- Province: West Azerbaijan
- County: Urmia
- District: Central
- Rural District: Baranduzchay-ye Jonubi

Population (2016)
  - Total: 496
- Time zone: UTC+3:30 (IRST)

Darin Qaleh (Persian: درين قلعه) (Note: Also romanized as Darīn Qal‘eh) is a village in Baranduzchay-ye Jonubi Rural District of the Central District in Urmia County, West Azerbaijan province, Iran.

== Demographics ==
=== Population ===
At the time of the 2006 National Census, the village's population was 379 in 74 households. The following census in 2011 counted 408 people in 100 households. The 2016 census measured the population of the village as 496 people in 117 households.
