= Hakob Karapents =

Iranian-Armenian author

- Յակոբ Կարապենց
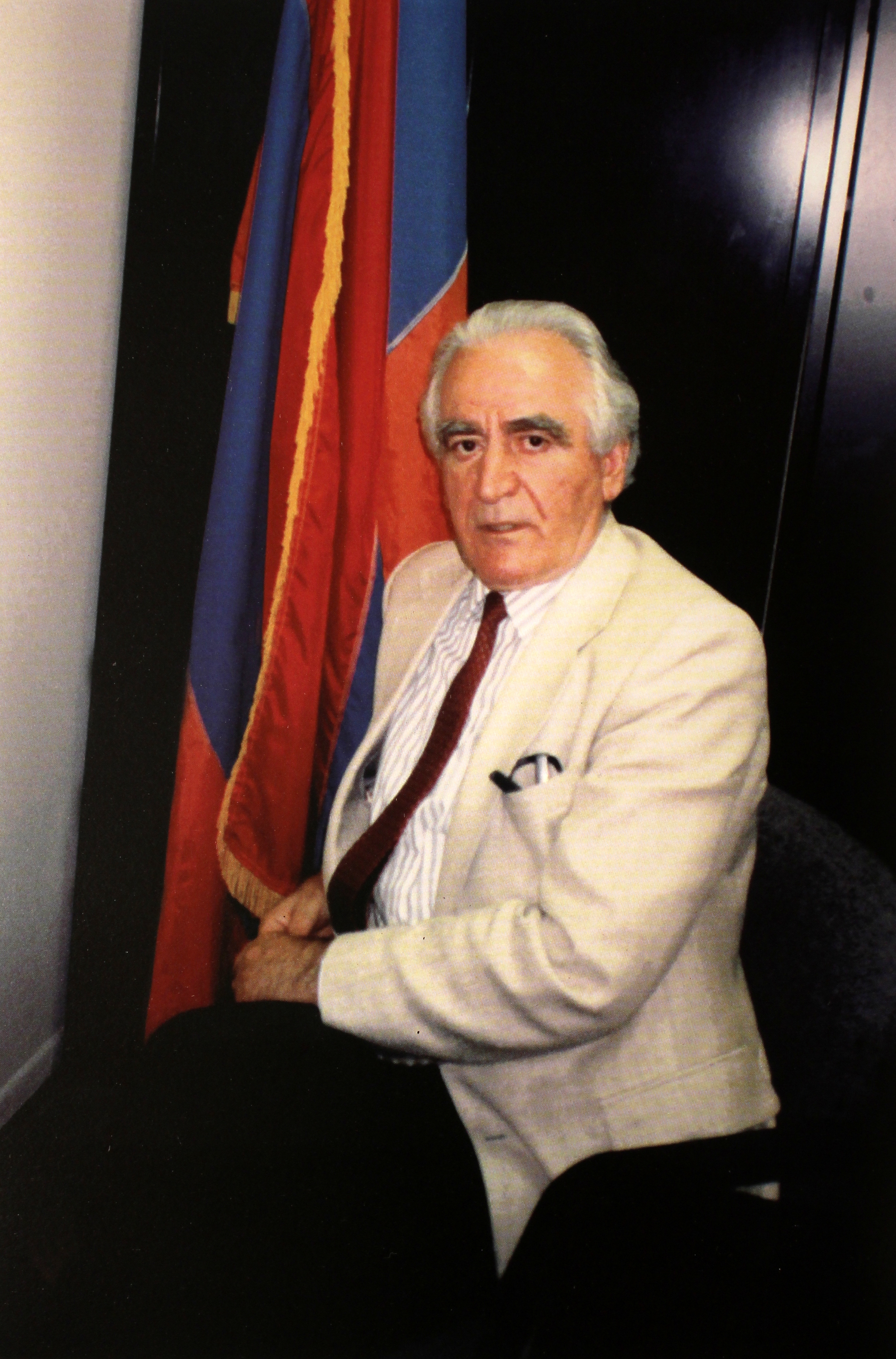
- Born: August 9, 1925; Tabriz, Iran
- Died: October 20, 1994 (aged 69); Watertown, Massachusetts, United States
- Other name: Jack Karapetian
- Citizenship: United States
- Occupation: author

Hakob Karapents (Armenian: Յակոբ Կարապենց), also known as Jack Karapetian, was a prolific Iranian-Armenian author born in 1925 in Tabriz, Iran.

He settled in the United States in 1947. Karapents majored in journalism at Kansas City University and later studied psychology at Columbia University. From 1954 to 1979, he worked for Voice of America.

He wrote numerous novels and short stories in both Armenian and English. He died in 1994 in Watertown, Massachusetts.

== Selected writings ==
Novels

- Կարթագենի դուստրը (The Daughter of Carthago, Beirut, 1972)
- Ադամի գիրքը (The Book of Adam, New York, 1983)

Short Story Collections

- Անծանօթ հոգիներ (Unknown Souls, Beirut, 1970)
- Նոր աշխարհի հին սերմնացանները (The Old Sowers of the New World, Beirut, 1975)
- Միջնարար (Intermezzo, New York, 1981)
- Ամերիկեան շուրջպար (American Circle Dance, New York, 1986)
- Անկատար (Imperfect, New York, 1987)
- Մի մարդ ու մի երկիր եւ այլ պատմուածքներ (A Man and A Country and Other Stories, Watertown, Ma., 1994)
- Return and Tiger and Other Short Stories, Tatul Sonentz-Papazian, tr. (Watertown, Ma., 1995)

Essays

- Երկու աշխարհ (Watertown, Ma., 1992)
- Մտորումներ (Arlington, Ma., 2009)

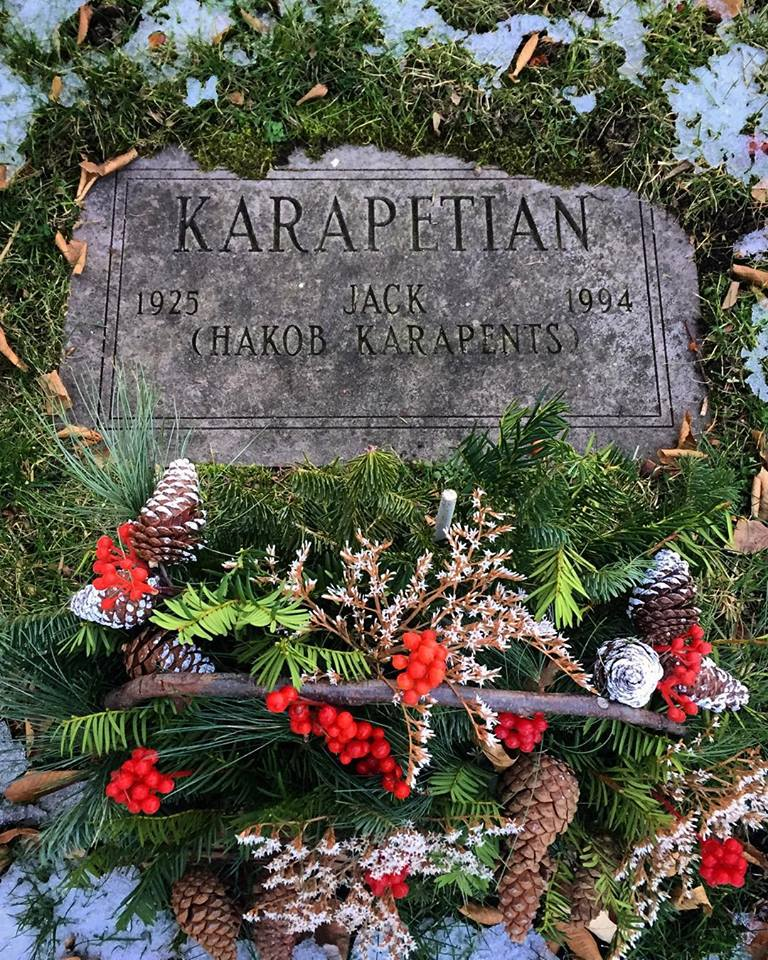
Karapents' gravestone at Mount Auburn Cemetery in Watertown, MA
