= Arshi (poet) =

Iranian Armenian poet (1905–1989)

Arshaloys Babayean (Persian: آرشالویس بابائیان; Armenian: Արշալույս Բաբայան; 1905, Tabriz, Qajar Iran– 1989, Tehran, Iran), known by the pen name Arshi (Armenian: Արշի; Persian: آرشی), was an Iranian-Armenian poet.
