= Gajin, West Azerbaijan =

Village in West Azerbaijan province, Iran

Gajin Persian: گجين
- Village
- Location within Iran
- Coordinates: 37°37′04″N 45°00′24″E
- Country: Iran
- Province: West Azerbaijan
- County: Urmia
- District: Central
- Rural District: Rowzeh Chay

Population (2016)
  - Total: 1,734
- Time zone: UTC+3:30 (IRST)

Gajin (Persian: گجين) (Note: Also romanized as Gajīn; also known as Kajīn) is a village in Rowzeh Chay Rural District of the Central District in Urmia County, West Azerbaijan province, Iran.

== Demographics ==
=== Population ===
At the time of the 2006 National Census, the village's population was 1,703 in 420 households. The following census in 2011 counted 1,791 people in 532 households. The 2016 census measured the population of the village as 1,734 people in 501 households.
