= Rowzeh Chay Rural District =

Rural district in West Azerbaijan province, Iran

Rowzeh Chay Rural District Persian: دهستان روضه‌چای
- Rural District
- Location within Iran
- Coordinates: 37°35′N 44°58′E
- Country: Iran
- Province: West Azerbaijan
- County: Urmia
- District: Central
- Established: 1987
- Capital: Balu

Population (2016)
  - Total: 41,843
- Time zone: UTC+3:30 (IRST)

Rowzeh Chay Rural District (Persian: دهستان روضه‌چای) is in the Central District of Urmia County, West Azerbaijan province, Iran. Its capital is the village of Balu.

== Demographics ==
=== Population ===
At the time of the 2006 National Census, the rural district's population was 36,556 in 8,178 households. There were 47,510 inhabitants in 12,522 households at the following census of 2011. The 2016 census measured the population of the rural district as 41,843 in 11,073 households. The most populous of its 34 villages was Balu, with 14,058 people.

=== Other villages in the rural district ===
- Anhar-e Olya
- Anhar-e Sofla
- Badaki
- Gajin
- Jehatlu
- Kalhor
- Qarah Hasanlu
- Qezel Asheq
- Valendeh-ye Olya
- Valendeh-ye Sofla
- Zeynalu
