= Tulkan, West Azerbaijan =

Village in West Azerbaijan province, Iran

Tulkan Persian: تولكان
- Village
- Country: Iran
- Province: West Azerbaijan
- County: Urmia
- District: Central
- Rural District: Baranduzchay-ye Jonubi

Population (2016)
  - Total: 864
- Time zone: UTC+3:30 (IRST)

Tulkan (Persian: تولكان) (Note: Also romanized as Tūlkān) is a village in Baranduzchay-ye Jonubi Rural District of the Central District in Urmia County, West Azerbaijan province, Iran.

== Demographics ==
=== Population ===
At the time of the 2006 National Census, the village's population was 455 in 106 households. The following census in 2011 counted 601 people in 175 households. The 2016 census measured the population of the village as 864 people in 220 households.
