= Balu, West Azerbaijan =

Village in West Azerbaijan province, Iran

Balu Persian: بالو
- Village
- Location within Iran
- Coordinates: 37°37′54″N 45°02′10″E
- Country: Iran
- Province: West Azerbaijan
- County: Urmia
- District: Central
- Rural District: Rowzeh Chay

Population (2016)
  - Total: 14,058
- Time zone: UTC+3:30 (IRST)

Balu (Persian: بالو, romanized: Balav; (Note: Also known as Bálov, Bālū, and Belū.) Syriac: Bālū) is a village in, and the capital of, Rowzeh Chay Rural District in the Central District of Urmia County, West Azerbaijan province, Iran.

== History ==
Bālū was inhabited by 30 Church of the East Christian families and was served by the Church of Mār Quriāqōs and 1 priest in 1862, according to the Russian archimandrite Sophoniah. At this time, the priest Paul of Bālū also tended to the smaller villages of Bozlū, Haṣār, Qārāgōz, and Paqabajlūi. There were 38 Church of the East Christian families and 1 church but no priest at Bālū in 1877, as per Edward Lewes Cutts. Basil Nikitin, the Russian consul at Urmia, noted that Bālū was inhabited by Christians and Muslims just before the First World War. It was located in the Anzel district.

== Demographics ==
=== Population ===
At the time of the 2006 National Census, the village's population was 10,524 in 2,274 households. The following census in 2011 counted 12,501 people in 3,200 households. The 2016 census measured the population of the village as 14,058 people in 3,639 households. It was the most populous village in its rural district.

== Bibliography ==
- Wilmshurst, David (2000). The Ecclesiastical Organisation of the Church of the East, 1318–1913 (PDF). Peeters Publishers.
