= Yaghmur Ali =

Yaghmur Ali یغمورعلی
- Village
- Location within Iran
- Coordinates: 37°41′51″N 45°06′44″E
- Country: Iran
- Province: West Azerbaijan
- County: Urmia
- Bakhsh: Central
- Rural District: Bash Qaleh

Population (2006)
  - Total: 232
- Time zone: UTC+3:30 (IRST)
  - Summer (DST): UTC+4:30 (IRDT)

Yaghmur Ali (Persian: یغمورعلی, romanized: Yaghmūr ‘Alī; Syriac: Yāghmūralūi) (Note: Also known as Yaghmūr A‘lá.) is a village in Bash Qaleh Rural District, in the Central District of Urmia County, West Azerbaijan Province, Iran. At the 2006 census, its population was 232, in 72 families.

== History ==
Yāghmūralūi was inhabited by 20 Church of the East Christian families in 1862 and was served by the Church of Mār Quriāqōs but did not have a priest, according to the Russian archimandrite Sophoniah, at which time the village was served by the priest Paul of Qīzīlʿāshīq. There were 18 Church of the East Christian families at Yāghmūralūi in 1877 with 1 church and no priests, as per Edward Lewes Cutts. It was located in the Anzel District.

== Bibliography ==
- Wilmshurst, David (2000). The Ecclesiastical Organisation of the Church of the East, 1318–1913 (PDF). Peeters Publishers.
