= Hesar-e Agh Bolagh =

Village in West Azerbaijan province, Iran

Hesar-e Agh Bolagh Persian: حصاراغ بلاغ
- Village
- Location within Iran
- Coordinates: 37°21′35″N 45°03′33″E
- Country: Iran
- Province: West Azerbaijan
- County: Urmia
- District: Central
- Rural District: Baranduzchay-ye Jonubi

Population (2016)
  - Total: 417
- Time zone: UTC+3:30 (IRST)

Hesar-e Agh Bolagh (Persian: حصاراغ بلاغ) (Note: Also romanized as Ḩeşār-e Āgh Bolāgh; also known as Ḩeşār-e Āq Bolāgh and Ḩeşār-e Āqbolāgh) is a village in Baranduzchay-ye Jonubi Rural District of the Central District in Urmia County, West Azerbaijan province, Iran.

== Demographics ==
=== Population ===
At the time of the 2006 National Census, the village's population was 424 in 73 households. The following census in 2011 counted 310 people in 70 households. The 2016 census measured the population of the village as 417 people in 92 households.
