= Kalhor, West Azerbaijan =

Village in West Azerbaijan province, Iran

Kalhor Persian: كلهر
- Village
- Location within Iran
- Coordinates: 37°35′53″N 44°53′34″E
- Country: Iran
- Province: West Azerbaijan
- County: Urmia
- District: Central
- Rural District: Rowzeh Chay

Population (2016)
  - Total: 700
- Time zone: UTC+3:30 (IRST)

Kalhor (Persian: كلهر) (Note: Formerly known as Golhar (گلهر)) is a village in Rowzeh Chay Rural District of the Central District in Urmia County, West Azerbaijan province, Iran.

== Demographics ==
=== Population ===
At the time of the 2006 National Census, the village's population, as Golhar, was 685 in 115 households. The following census in 2011 counted 688 people in 179 households, by which time the village was listed as Kalhor. The 2016 census measured the population of the village as 700 people in 158 households.
