= Anhar-e Olya =

Village in West Azerbaijan province, Iran

Anhar-e Olya Persian: انهرعليا
- Village
- Location within Iran
- Coordinates: 37°35′19″N 44°58′45″E
- Country: Iran
- Province: West Azerbaijan
- County: Urmia
- District: Central
- Rural District: Rowzeh Chay

Population (2016)
  - Total: 666
- Time zone: UTC+3:30 (IRST)

Anhar-e Olya (Persian: انهرعليا) (Note: Also romanized as Anhar-e ‘Olyā; also known as Anhar) is a village in Rowzeh Chay Rural District of the Central District in Urmia County, West Azerbaijan province, Iran.

== Demographics ==
=== Population ===
At the time of the 2006 National Census, the village's population was 785 in 222 households. The following census in 2011 counted 567 people in 187 households. The 2016 census measured the population of the village as 666 people in 231 households.
