= Asiran =

Asiran اسيران
- Village
- Location within Iran
- Coordinates: 39°01′30″N 47°04′11″E
- Country: Iran
- Province: East Azerbaijan
- County: Khoda Afarin
- Bakhsh: Central
- Rural District: Keyvan

Population (2006)
  - Total: 42
- Time zone: UTC+3:30 (IRST)
  - Summer (DST): UTC+4:30 (IRDT)

Asiran (Persian: اسيران, also Romanized as Āsīrān; in Armenian: Ասրան) is a village in Keyvan Rural District, in the Central District of Khoda Afarin County, East Azerbaijan Province, Iran. At the 2006 census, its population was 42, in 9 families. The village is populated by the Kurdish Mohammad Khanlu tribe.
