= Kelisan =

Kelisan كليسان
- Village
- Location within Iran
- Coordinates: 32°26′31″N 51°35′37″E
- Country: Iran
- Province: Isfahan
- County: Falavarjan
- Bakhsh: Pir Bakran
- Rural District: Garkan-e Shomali

Population (2006)
  - Total: 383
- Time zone: UTC+3:30 (IRST)
  - Summer (DST): UTC+4:30 (IRDT)

Kelisan (Persian: كليسان, also Romanized as Kelīsān and Kalīsān) is a village in Garkan-e Shomali Rural District, Pir Bakran District, Falavarjan County, Isfahan Province, Iran. At the 2006 census, its population was 383, in 104 families.
