= Siran, East Azerbaijan =

Siran سيران
- Village
- Location within Iran
- Coordinates: 38°57′46″N 47°05′20″E
- Country: Iran
- Province: East Azerbaijan
- County: Kaleybar
- Bakhsh: Central
- Rural District: Yeylaq

Population (2006)
  - Total: 23
- Time zone: UTC+3:30 (IRST)
  - Summer (DST): UTC+4:30 (IRDT)

Siran (Persian: سيران, also Romanized as Sīrān) is a village in Yeylaq Rural District, in the Central District of Kaleybar County, East Azerbaijan Province, Iran. At the 2006 census, its population was 23, in 4 families.
