= Saki-ye Olya =

Saki-ye Olya ساكي عليا
- Village
- Location within Iran
- Coordinates: 33°48′17″N 49°49′29″E
- Country: Iran
- Province: Markazi
- County: Arak
- Bakhsh: Central
- Rural District: Shamsabad

Population (2006)
  - Total: 128
- Time zone: UTC+3:30 (IRST)
  - Summer (DST): UTC+4:30 (IRDT)

Saki-ye Olya (Persian: ساكي عليا, also Romanized as Sākī-ye ‘Olyā and Sakī ‘Olya; also known as Sākī, Sākī Bālā, Sākī-ye Bālā, Shāqi Auliya, and Shāqī-ye ‘Olyā) is a village in Shamsabad Rural District, in the Central District of Arak County, Markazi Province, Iran. At the 2006 census, its population was 128, in 29 families.
