= Avanlu =

Avanlu اوانلو
- Village
- Location within Iran
- Coordinates: 39°02′16″N 47°04′36″E
- Country: Iran
- Province: East Azerbaijan
- County: Khoda Afarin
- Bakhsh: Central
- Rural District: Keyvan

Population (2006)
  - Total: 29
- Time zone: UTC+3:30 (IRST)
  - Summer (DST): UTC+4:30 (IRDT)

Avanlu (Persian: اوانلو, also Romanized as Āvānlū) is a village in Keyvan Rural District, in the Central District of Khoda Afarin County, East Azerbaijan Province, Iran. At the 2006 census, its population was 29, in 7 families. The village is populated by the Kurdish Mohammad Khanlu tribe.
