= Davudabad-e Mokhtar =

Davudabad-e Mokhtar داودابادمختار
- Village
- Location within Iran
- Coordinates: 30°40′47″N 51°30′09″E
- Country: Iran
- Province: Kohgiluyeh and Boyer-Ahmad
- County: Boyer-Ahmad
- Bakhsh: Central
- Rural District: Sarrud-e Jonubi

Population (2006)
  - Total: 102
- Time zone: UTC+3:30 (IRST)
  - Summer (DST): UTC+4:30 (IRDT)

Davudabad-e Mokhtar (Persian: داودابادمختار, also Romanized as Dāvūdābād-e Mokhtār; also known as Dāvodābād and Dāvūdābād) is a village in Sarrud-e Jonubi Rural District, in the Central District of Boyer-Ahmad County, Kohgiluyeh and Boyer-Ahmad Province, Iran. At the 2006 census, its population was 102, in 21 families.
