= Qaraguz-e Hajji Baba =

Qaraguz-e Hajji Baba قراگوز حاجی‌بابا
- Village
- Location within Iran
- Coordinates: 37°38′11″N 45°05′26″E
- Country: Iran
- Province: West Azerbaijan
- County: Urmia
- Bakhsh: Central
- Rural District: Nazluy-ye Jonubi

Population (2006)
  - Total: 146
- Time zone: UTC+3:30 (IRST)
  - Summer (DST): UTC+4:30 (IRDT)

Qaraguz-e Hajji Baba (Persian: قراگوز حاجی‌بابا, also Romanized as Qarāgūz-e Ḩājjī Bābā; also known as Qarāgūz-e Ḩājjī Āqā and Qareh Gūz-e Ḩājjībābā) is a village in Nazluy-ye Jonubi Rural District, in the Central District of Urmia County, West Azerbaijan Province, Iran. At the 2006 census, its population was 146, in 43 families.
