= Gardabad =

Village in West Azerbaijan province, Iran

Gardabad Persian: گردآباد
- Village
- Location within Iran
- Coordinates: 37°38′19″N 45°03′07″E
- Country: Iran
- Province: West Azerbaijan
- County: Urmia
- District: Central
- Rural District: Nazluy-e Jonubi

Population (2016)
  - Total: 417
- Time zone: UTC+3:30 (IRST)

Gardabad (Persian: گرداباد, romanized: Gardābād; Syriac: Gardābād) (Note: Also known as Gardabatt, Garūābād, and Giardābād.) is a village in Nazluy-e Jonubi Rural District of the Central District in Urmia County, West Azerbaijan province, Iran. The village has at least one Armenian church.

== History ==
Basil Nikitin, the Russian consul at Urmia, noted that Gardābād was entirely populated by Christians just before the First World War. Prior to the First World War, there were 100 Assyrian houses at Gardābād, as per the list presented by Agha Petros to the Lausanne Peace Conference in 1922. It was located in the Anzel District.

== Demographics ==
=== Population ===
At the time of the 2006 National Census, the village's population was 537 in 127 households. The following census in 2011 counted 332 people in 85 households. The 2016 census measured the population of the village as 417 people in 127 households.

== Notable people ==
- Hovhannes Badalyan (1924–2001), Armenian singer

== Bibliography ==
- Amurian, Andre; Kasheff, Manouchehr (1986). "ARMENIANS OF MODERN IRAN". In Yarshater, Ehsan (ed.). Encyclopædia Iranica (Online ed.). Encyclopædia Iranica Foundation.
- Gaunt, David (2006). Massacres, Resistance, Protectors: Muslim-Christian Relations in Eastern Anatolia during World War I. Gorgias Press.
- Wilmshurst, David (2000). The Ecclesiastical Organisation of the Church of the East, 1318–1913 (PDF). Peeters Publishers.
