= Tazeh Kand-e Vinaq =

Tazeh Kand-e Vinaq تازه كندوينق
- Village
- Location within Iran
- Coordinates: 38°58′10″N 46°54′58″E
- Country: Iran
- Province: East Azerbaijan
- County: Khoda Afarin
- Bakhsh: Minjavan
- Rural District: Minjavan-e Sharqi

Population (2006)
  - Total: 118
- Time zone: UTC+3:30 (IRST)
  - Summer (DST): UTC+4:30 (IRDT)

Tazeh Kand-e Vinaq (Persian: تازه كندوينق, also Romanized as Tāzeh Kand-e Vīnaq; also known as Tāzkand; in Armenian: Նորաշէն) is a village in Minjavan-e Sharqi Rural District, Minjavan District, Khoda Afarin County, East Azerbaijan Province, Iran. At the 2006 census, its population was 118, in 32 families.
