= Ardashes Badmagrian =

- Born: 1863; Tabriz, Iran
- Died: 1928 (aged 64–65); Tabriz, Iran
- Occupation: Movie Theater owner

Ardashes Badmagrian or Artashes Patmgrian (known as Ardashir Khan) (1863–1928) was an Iranian Armenian Movie Theater owner. Badmagarian had worked at Pathé in Paris at the turn of the century and had brought back to Persia the cinematograph, the phonograph, and the bicycle.

== Biography ==
Born in 1863, he was an Armenian living in Tabriz and known as "Vosouq al-Tojar". A textile merchant, he always journeyed to neighboring countries, and once traveling to France in 1900, he saw moving pictures on screen. He brought with him a bicycle, a gramophone and a film projector as souvenirs. He opened a saloon in 1912 in "ʿAlāʾ-al-Dawla Street" (now renamed Ferdowsi street) and called it "Tajadod Cinema^{a}". His saloon was closed the following year for unknown reasons, and he opened a new one, "Modern Cinema", in 1915, which was also closed. A pioneer in inaugurating movie-theaters, Areshir Khan was so persistent that he opened the third one, "Khorshid Cinema", in 1917. He usually imported the films he screened in his saloons, and when he failed to import new films, "Khorshid Cinema" was also to close. His fourth attempt led to a roofless cinema located in Amiriye neighborhood and next to main lamp post, which was impeded by the running of his film projector, and so had it to be wound up on police decree. He went to Paris for medical cure in 1928, but died there following an aborted surgery.

== Notes ==
^a Modernity Movie Theater
