= Nakhjavan Tappeh =

Nakhjavan Tappeh نخجوان تپه
- Village
- Location within Iran
- Coordinates: 37°42′42″N 45°06′12″E
- Country: Iran
- Province: West Azerbaijan
- County: Urmia
- Bakhsh: Nazlu
- Rural District: Nazlu-e Shomali

Population (2006)
  - Total: 105
- Time zone: UTC+3:30 (IRST)
  - Summer (DST): UTC+4:30 (IRDT)

Nakhjavan Tappeh (Persian: نخجوان تپه, romanized: Nakhjavān Tappeh) (Note: Also known as Nakchivan Tepe and Naḵǰevān-tapa.) is a village in Nazlu-e Shomali Rural District, Nazlu District, Urmia County, West Azerbaijan province, Iran. At the 2006 census, its population was 105, in 28 families. It is inhabited by Armenians.

== History ==
The Church of Saint Mary at Nakchivan Tepe was built in the 17th century. Basil Nikitin, the Russian consul at Urmia, noted that the village was entirely populated by Christians prior to the First World War. It was located in the Anzel District. The Church of Saint Mary underwent restoration in 2020.

== Bibliography ==
- Amurian, Andre; Kasheff, Manouchehr (1986). "ARMENIANS OF MODERN IRAN". In Yarshater, Ehsan (ed.). Encyclopædia Iranica (Online ed.). Encyclopædia Iranica Foundation.
- Wilmshurst, David (2000). The Ecclesiastical Organisation of the Church of the East, 1318–1913 (PDF). Peeters Publishers.
