= Hovhannes Badalyan =

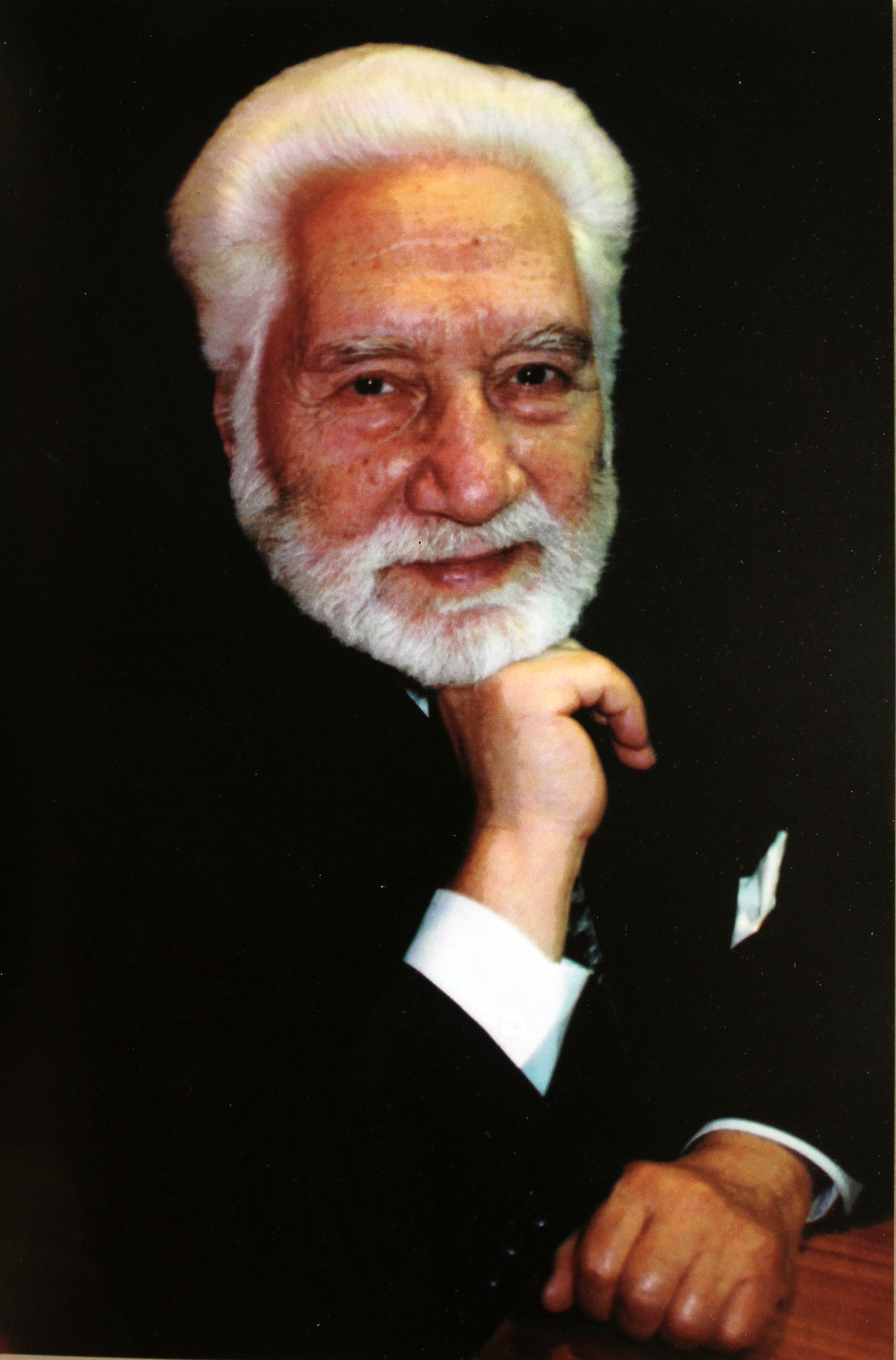

Background information
- Born: Hovhannes Hambardzumi Badalyan; December 15, 1924 village of Shavarin, near Hamadan, Iran
- Origin: Armenian
- Died: August 19, 2001 (aged 76) Yerevan
- Occupations: singer
- Instruments: tenor vocal
- Awards: People's Artist of Armenia (1961) Professor of Yerevan State Conservatory

Hovhannes Hambardzumi Badalyan (Armenian: Յովհաննէս Համբարձումի Բադալեան; December 15, 1924, in the village of Shavarin, near Hamadan, Iran – August 19, 2001, in Yerevan, Armenia) was an Armenian singer (tenor), People's Artist of the Armenian SSR (1961) and Professor of Yerevan State Conservatory.

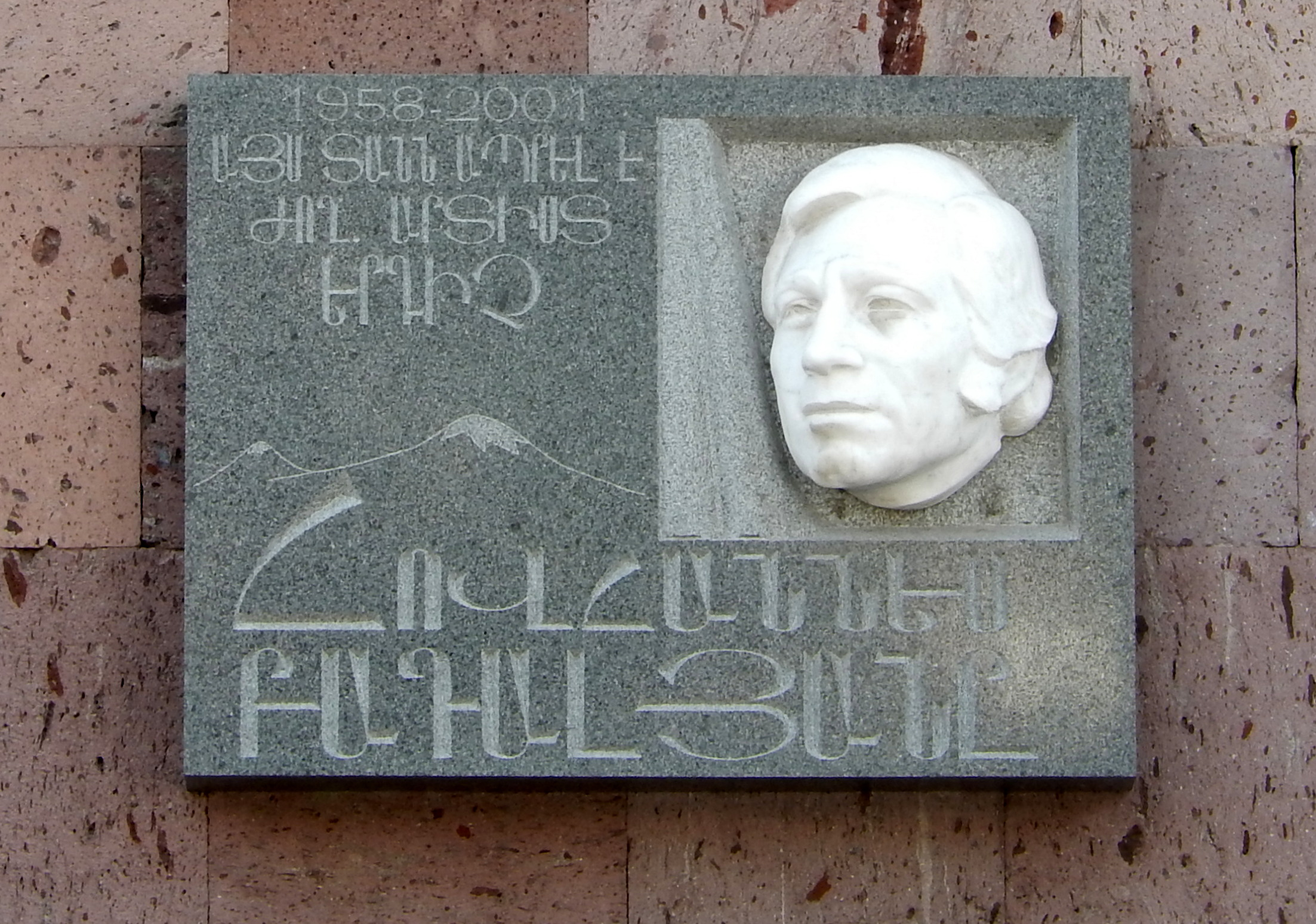
Hovhannes Badalyan's plaque in Yerevan

== Biography ==
Badalyan's parents were from the Armenian village of Gardabad near the city of Urmia. They became refugees when the Ottoman Army invaded northwestern Iran during the First World War. Hovhannes attended the local Armenian school in Baghdad, and in 1936 he returned to Iran where he started singing in Nicol Galanderian's choir. In Tehran, he studied and performed with Hambartzoom Grigorian and Karl Kulger. After World War II, Badalyan, then age 22, left Iran for Soviet Armenia, where he attended the Romanos Melikian Music College in Yerevan. In 1948, he joined the Folk Music Instruments Ensemble of Armenian Public Radio as a soloist. In 2001, his achievements were recognized with the Movses Khorenatsi Medal. Badalyan performed across the Soviet Union and the Middle East and on many world stages from Europe, Australia, Canada, and the US.

== Selected discography ==
- Golden Classics - Legendary Armenians - Hovhannes Badalyan
