= Keshish Qeshlaqi =

Keshish Qeshlaqi کشیش قشلاقی
- Village
- Location within Iran
- Coordinates: 39°02′39″N 46°51′49″E
- Country: Iran
- Province: East Azerbaijan
- County: Khoda Afarin
- Bakhsh: Minjavan
- Rural District: Minjavan-e Sharqi

Population (2006)
  - Total: 12
- Time zone: UTC+3:30 (IRST)
  - Summer (DST): UTC+4:30 (IRDT)

Keshish Qeshlaqi (Persian: کشیش قشلاقی, also Romanized as Keshīsh Qeshlāqī; also known as Keshīsh Qeshlāq and Kesh Qeshlāq) is a village in Minjavan-e Sharqi Rural District, Minjavan District, Khoda Afarin County, East Azerbaijan Province, Iran. At the 2006 census, its population was 12, in 5 families.
