= Qarah Hasanlu, West Azerbaijan =

Village in West Azerbaijan province, Iran

Qarah Hasanlu Persian: قره حسنلو
- Village
- Location within Iran
- Coordinates: 37°35′59″N 45°02′49″E
- Country: Iran
- Province: West Azerbaijan
- County: Urmia
- District: Central
- Rural District: Rowzeh Chay

Population (2016)
  - Total: 1,779
- Time zone: UTC+3:30 (IRST)

Qarah Hasanlu (Persian: قره حسنلو) (Note: Also romanized as Qarah Ḩasanlū and Qareh Ḩasanlū) is a village in Rowzeh Chay Rural District of the Central District in Urmia County, West Azerbaijan province, Iran.

== Demographics ==
=== Population ===
At the time of the 2006 National Census, the village's population was 1,002 in 285 households. The following census in 2011 counted 1,231 people in 388 households. The 2016 census measured the population of the village as 1,779 people in 549 households.
