= Seqin =

Seqin سقين
- Village
- Location within Iran
- Coordinates: 39°00′13″N 47°05′23″E
- Country: Iran
- Province: East Azerbaijan
- County: Khoda Afarin
- Bakhsh: Central
- Rural District: Keyvan

Population (2006)
  - Total: 75
- Time zone: UTC+3:30 (IRST)
  - Summer (DST): UTC+4:30 (IRDT)

Seqin (Persian: سقين, also Romanized as Seqīn; in Armenian: Սըղըն) is a village in Keyvan Rural District, in the Central District of Khoda Afarin County, East Azerbaijan Province, Iran. At the 2006 census, its population was 75, in 18 families. The village is populated by the Kurdish Mohammad Khanlu tribe.
