= Zeynalu, Urmia =

Village in West Azerbaijan province, Iran

Zeynalu Persian: زينالو
- Village
- Location within Iran
- Coordinates: 37°37′58″N 45°00′23″E
- Country: Iran
- Province: West Azerbaijan
- County: Urmia
- District: Central
- Rural District: Rowzeh Chay

Population (2016)
  - Total: 559
- Time zone: UTC+3:30 (IRST)

Zeynalu (Persian: زينالو, romanized: Zeynālū; Syriac: Zānālūi) (Note: Also known as Zaynālū and Zeynānlū.) is a village in Rowzeh Chay Rural District of the Central District in Urmia County, West Azerbaijan province, Iran.

== History ==
The Church of St Gavrā at Zānālūi is believed to date to between the 4th and 7th century AD. Zānālūi was inhabited by 15 Church of the East Christian families who were served by the Church of Mār Gawrā and 1 priest, according to the Russian archimandrite Sophoniah. There were 16 Church of the East Christian families with 1 church but no priests in 1877, as per Edward Lewes Cutts. It was located in the Anzel District.

A mound of archeological material located in the western part of the village was found to contain material dating to the third millennium BCE, as well as a later occupation layer dated to the Sasanian Period (224 - 651 CE).

== Demographics ==
=== Population ===
At the time of the 2006 National Census, the village's population was 577 in 153 households. The following census in 2011 counted 531 people in 168 households. The 2016 census measured the population of the village as 559 people in 170 households.

== Bibliography ==
- Al-Jeloo, Nicholas (2015). "Persian Christians: Assyrian art and architecture of Urmia as an example of regional cultural expression". Parole de l’Orient. 40: 13–27.
- Wilmshurst, David (2000). The Ecclesiastical Organisation of the Church of the East, 1318–1913 (PDF). Peeters Publishers.
