= Bozlu, Iran =

Bozlu بزلو
- Village
- Location within Iran
- Coordinates: 37°39′04″N 45°02′54″E
- Country: Iran
- Province: West Azerbaijan
- County: Urmia
- Bakhsh: Central
- Rural District: Nazluy-ye Jonubi

Population (2006)
  - Total: 55
- Time zone: UTC+3:30 (IRST)
  - Summer (DST): UTC+4:30 (IRDT)

Bozlu (Persian: بزلو, romanized: Bozlū) (Note: Also known as Bowzlū.) is a village in Nazluy-ye Jonubi Rural District, in the Central District of Urmia County, West Azerbaijan Province, Iran. At the 2006 census, its population was 55, in 17 families.

== History ==
Bozlū with Paqabajlūi was inhabited by 30 Church of the East Christian families and did not have a church or a priest in 1862, according to the Russian archimandrite Sophoniah. At this time, it was tended to by the priest Paul of Bālū. It was located in the Anzel district.

== Bibliography ==
- Wilmshurst, David (2000). The Ecclesiastical Organisation of the Church of the East, 1318–1913 (PDF). Peeters Publishers.
