= Avarsin =

Avarsin اوارسين
- Village
- Location within Iran
- Coordinates: 39°00′33″N 47°03′23″E
- Country: Iran
- Province: East Azerbaijan
- County: Khoda Afarin
- Bakhsh: Central
- Rural District: Keyvan

Population (2006)
  - Total: 97
- Time zone: UTC+3:30 (IRST)
  - Summer (DST): UTC+4:30 (IRDT)

Avarsin (Persian: اوارسين, also Romanized as Āvārsīn; also known as Varsīn) is a village in Keyvan Rural District, in the Central District of Khoda Afarin County, East Azerbaijan Province, Iran. At the 2006 census, its population was 97, in 22 families.
