= Qezeljah, Salmas =

Qezeljah قزلجه
- Village
- Location within Iran
- Coordinates: 38°11′58″N 44°53′39″E
- Country: Iran
- Province: West Azerbaijan
- County: Salmas
- Bakhsh: Central
- Rural District: Lakestan

Population (2006)
  - Total: 233
- Time zone: UTC+3:30 (IRST)
  - Summer (DST): UTC+4:30 (IRDT)

Qezeljah (Persian: قزلجه; in Armenian: Ղզլջա) is a village in Lakestan Rural District, in the Central District of Salmas County, West Azerbaijan Province, Iran. At the 2006 census, its population was 233, in 60 families. There is a small church in the village of Qezelhah.
