= Qarajelu, Khoy =

Qarajelu قراجلو
- Village
- Location within Iran
- Coordinates: 38°31′38″N 44°58′29″E
- Country: Iran
- Province: West Azerbaijan
- County: Khoy
- Bakhsh: Central
- Rural District: Qarah Su

Population (2006)
  - Total: 49
- Time zone: UTC+3:30 (IRST)
  - Summer (DST): UTC+4:30 (IRDT)

Qarajelu (Persian: قراجلو, also Romanized as Qarājelū; also known as Qarah Āghājlū; in Armenian: Ղարաջալի) is a village in Qarah Su Rural District, in the Central District of Khoy County, West Azerbaijan Province, Iran. At the 2006 census, its population was 49, in 12 families.
