= Valendeh-ye Sofla =

Village in West Azerbaijan province, Iran

Valendeh-ye Sofla Persian: ولنده سفلی
- Village
- Location within Iran
- Coordinates: 37°35′35″N 45°01′05″E
- Country: Iran
- Province: West Azerbaijan
- County: Urmia
- District: Central
- Rural District: Rowzeh Chay

Population (2016)
  - Total: 1,514
- Time zone: UTC+3:30 (IRST)

Valendeh-ye Sofla (Persian: ولنده سفلی) (Note: Also romanized as Valendeh-e Soflá and Valendeh-ye Soflá; formerly known as Valindeh-ye Sofla (ولينده سفلی), also romanized as Valīndeh-ye Soflá) is a village in Rowzeh Chay Rural District of the Central District in Urmia County, West Azerbaijan province, Iran.

== Demographics ==
=== Population ===
At the time of the 2006 National Census, the village's population, as Valindeh-ye Sofla, was 586 in 123 households. The following census in 2011 counted 861 people in 215 households, by which time the village ws listed as Valendeh-ye Sofla. The 2016 census measured the population of the village as 1,514 people in 379 households.
