= Bourvari =

Bourvari (Armenian: Բուրուարի) is a collection of villages in Iran, between the city of Khomein (Markazi province) and Aligoodarz (Lorestān Province).

Bourvari was mainly populated by Armenians who were brought to the region by Shah Abbas of the Safavid dynasty in 1603 and 1604.

The following is a list of villages, which were part of Bourvari:

1. Dehno
2. Khorzend
3. Farajabad
4. Bahmanabad
5. Sangesfid
6. Gharekariz
7. Goz

== See also ==
- Armenians
- Armenian Diaspora
- New Julfa
- Ispahan
- Peria
