= Dowgi Daraq =

Dowgi Daraq دوگي درق
- Village
- Location within Iran
- Coordinates: 39°03′57″N 47°04′02″E
- Country: Iran
- Province: East Azerbaijan
- County: Khoda Afarin
- Bakhsh: Central
- Rural District: Keyvan

Population (2006)
  - Total: 32
- Time zone: UTC+3:30 (IRST)
  - Summer (DST): UTC+4:30 (IRDT)

Dowgi Daraq (Persian: دوگي درق, also Romanized as Dowgī Daraq; in Armenian: Դոգույդարա) is a village in Keyvan Rural District, in the Central District of Khoda Afarin County, East Azerbaijan Province, Iran. At the 2006 census, its population was 32, in 6 families. The village is populated by the Kurdish Mohammad Khanlu tribe.
