= Kukiya =

Village in West Azerbaijan province, Iran

Kukiya Persian: كوكيا
- Village
- Location within Iran
- Coordinates: 37°22′06″N 45°08′56″E
- Country: Iran
- Province: West Azerbaijan
- County: Urmia
- District: Central
- Rural District: Baranduzchay-ye Jonubi

Population (2016)
  - Total: 716
- Time zone: UTC+3:30 (IRST)

Kukiya (Persian: كوكيا, romanized: Kūkīā) (Note: Also known as Kiukia and Kūkīyā.) is a village in Baranduzchay-ye Jonubi Rural Districtof the Central District in Urmia County, West Azerbaijan province, Iran. The village has at least one Armenian church.

== History ==
Kukiya is identified with the diocese of Chuchia, suffragan of the metropolis of Ormi Superior (Upper Urmi), which is mentioned in the letter of Patriarch Abdisho IV Maron sent to Pope Pius IV in 1562 as one of the dioceses that recognised his authority. A funerary shrine dedicated to Mar Gewargis was located in the village.

== Demographics ==
=== Population ===
At the time of the 2006 National Census, the village's population was 659 in 160 households. The following census in 2011 counted 691 people in 193 households. The 2016 census measured the population of the village as 716 people in 203 households.

== Bibliography ==
- Al-Jeloo, Nicholas (2010). "Evidence in Stone and Wood: The Assyrian/Syriac History and Heritage of the Urmia Region in Iran, as Reconstructed from Epigraphic Evidence". Parole de l’Orient. 35: 1–27.
- Amurian, Andre; Kasheff, Manouchehr (1986). "ARMENIANS OF MODERN IRAN". In Yarshater, Ehsan (ed.). Encyclopædia Iranica (Online ed.). Encyclopædia Iranica Foundation.
- Wilmshurst, David (2000). The Ecclesiastical Organisation of the Church of the East, 1318–1913 (PDF). Peeters Publishers.
