= Naposhteh =

Naposhteh ناپشته
- Village
- Location within Iran
- Coordinates: 38°53′59″N 46°56′11″E
- Country: Iran
- Province: East Azerbaijan
- County: Kaleybar
- Bakhsh: Central
- Rural District: Misheh Pareh

Population (2006)
  - Total: 45
- Time zone: UTC+3:30 (IRST)
  - Summer (DST): UTC+4:30 (IRDT)

Naposhteh (Persian: ناپشته, also Romanized as Nāposhteh; also known as Nefishta; in Armenian: Նէփէշթ) is a village in Misheh Pareh Rural District, in the Central District of Kaleybar County, East Azerbaijan Province, Iran. At the 2006 census, its population was 45, in 11 families.
