= Sheverin =

Village in Hamadan province, Iran

Sheverin Persian: شورين
- Village
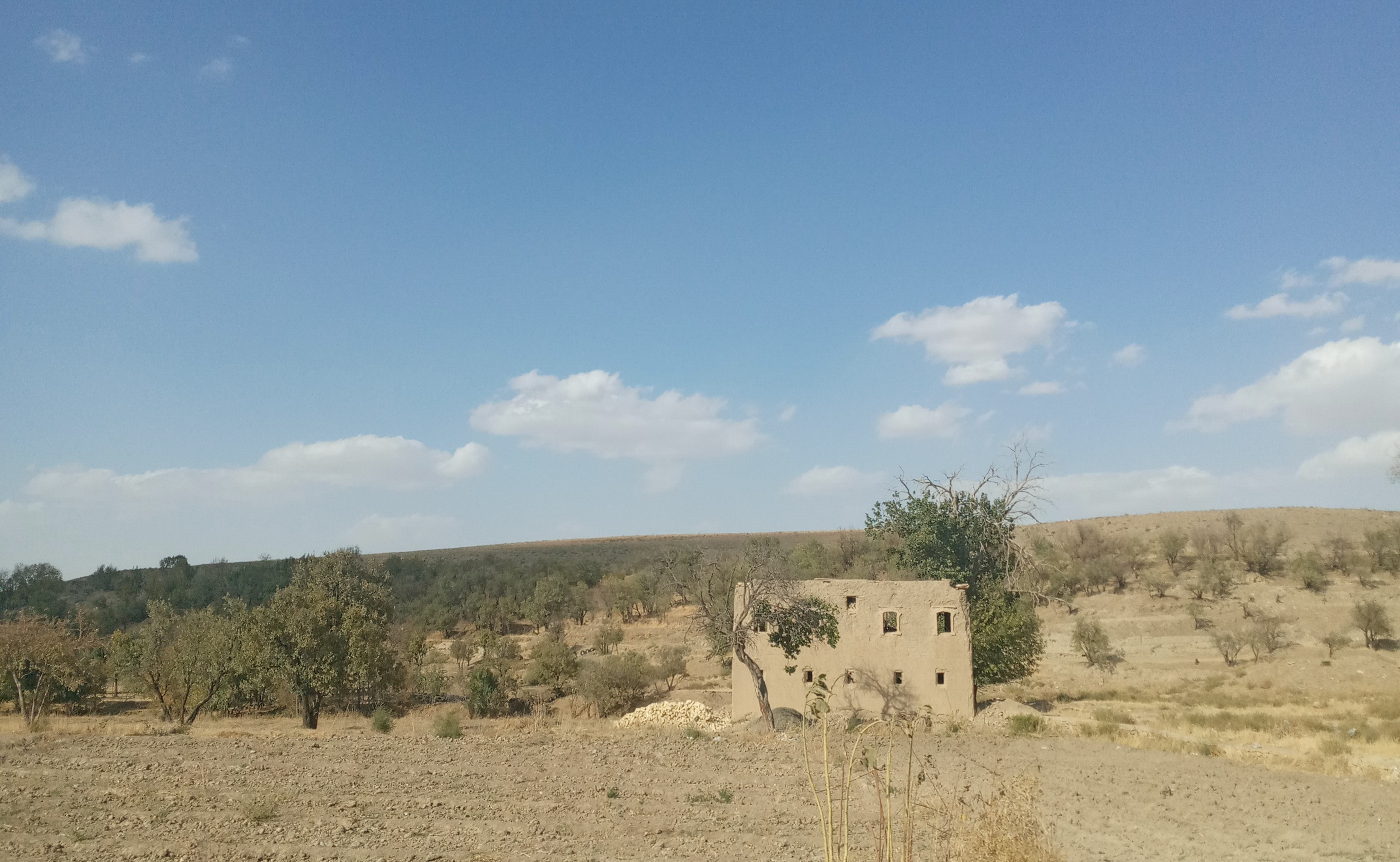
- The village of Sheverin

- Location within Iran
- Coordinates: 34°48′22″N 48°34′11″E
- Country: Iran
- Province: Hamadan
- County: Hamadan
- District: Central
- Rural District: Sangestan

Population (2016)
  - Total: 4,473
- Time zone: UTC+3:30 (IRST)

Sheverin (Persian: شورين) (Note: Also romanized as Shaverīn, Shawarīn, Shevarīn, and Shūrīn) is a village in Sangestan Rural District of the Central District in Hamadan County, Hamadan province, Iran.

== Demographics ==
=== Population ===
At the time of the 2006 National Census, the village's population was 3,870 in 1,034 households. The following census in 2011 counted 4,445 people in 1,255 households. The 2016 census measured the population of the village as 4,473 people in 1,347 households, the most populous in its rural district.

== In literature ==
In 1906 Abraham Valentine Williams Jackson described Sheverin as an Armenian village where there were fine gardens.

== Notable people ==
- Hovhannes Badalyan (1924-2001), Armenian singer and professor
