= Balanej =

Village in West Azerbaijan province, Iran

Balanej Persian: بالانج
- Village
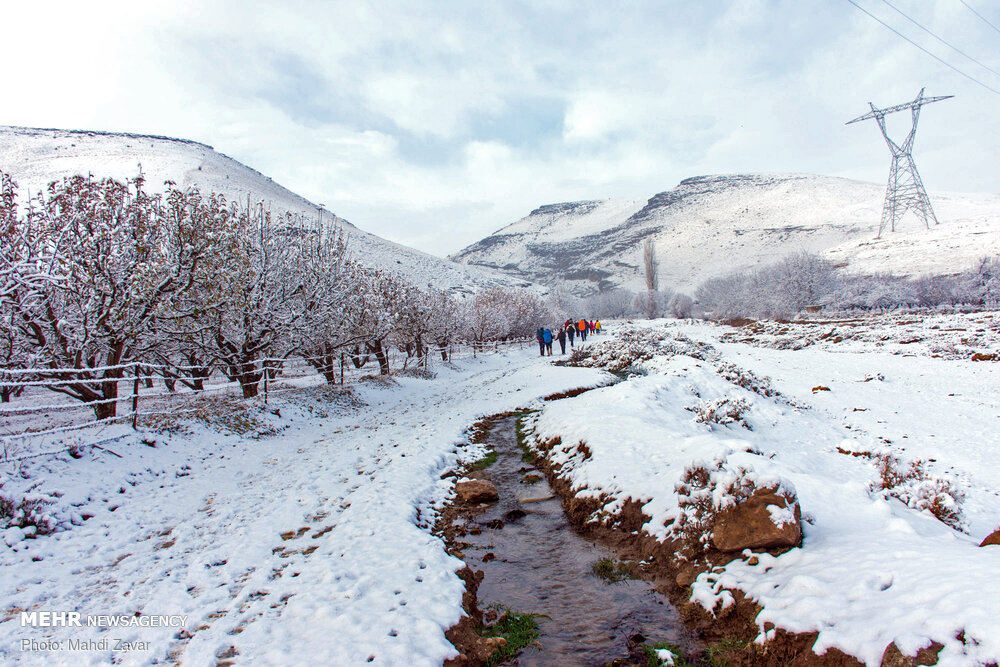
- The village of Balanej

- Location within Iran
- Coordinates: 37°23′48″N 45°09′50″E
- Country: Iran
- Province: West Azerbaijan
- County: Urmia
- District: Central
- Rural District: Baranduzchay-ye Jonubi

Population (2016)
  - Total: 3,023
- Time zone: UTC+3:30 (IRST)

Balanej (Persian: بالانج, romanized: Bālānaj; Syriac: Bālānōsh) (Note: Also known as Bālānej, Balānej, and Bālānj.) is a village in, and the capital of, Baranduzchay-ye Jonubi Rural District in the Central District of Urmia County, West Azerbaijan province, Iran.

== History ==
Bālānōsh was inhabited by 37 Church of the East Christian families with no priest or church in 1877, as per Edward Lewes Cutts. Basil Nikitin, the Russian consul at Urmia, recorded that the village was populated by Christians and Muslims just before the First World War. It was located in the Baranduz district.

== Demographics ==
=== Population ===
At the time of the 2006 National Census, the village's population was 2,189 in 506 households. The following census in 2011 counted 2,407 people in 629 households. The 2016 census measured the population of the village as 3,023 people in 797 households. It was the most populous village in its rural district.

== Bibliography ==
- Wilmshurst, David (2000). The Ecclesiastical Organisation of the Church of the East, 1318–1913 (PDF). Peeters Publishers.
