= Kajarestan =

Kajarestan كجارستان
- Village
- Location within Iran
- Coordinates: 33°44′51″N 49°40′46″E
- Country: Iran
- Province: Markazi
- County: Khomeyn
- Bakhsh: Kamareh
- Rural District: Khorram Dasht

Population (2006)
  - Total: 281
- Time zone: UTC+3:30 (IRST)
  - Summer (DST): UTC+4:30 (IRDT)

Kajarestan (Persian: كجارستان, also Romanized as Kajārestān; also known as Gajarestān) is a village in Khorram Dasht Rural District, Kamareh District, Khomeyn County, Markazi Province, Iran. At the 2006 census, its population was 281, in 69 families.
