= Lameh-ye Arameneh =

Lameh-ye Aramaneh لمه ارامنه
- Village
- Location within Iran
- Coordinates: 38°54′33″N 46°41′59″E
- Country: Iran
- Province: East Azerbaijan
- County: Khoda Afarin
- Bakhsh: Minjavan
- Rural District: Minjavan-e Gharbi

Population
  - Total: 234
- Time zone: UTC+3:30 (IRST)
  - Summer (DST): UTC+4:30 (IRDT)

Lameh-ye Aramaneh (Persian: لمه ارامنه, also Romanized as Lyuma; in Armenian: Լիւմա) is a village in Minjavan-e Gharbi Rural District, Minjavan District, Khoda Afarin County, East Azerbaijan Province, Iran.
