= Gandom Nan =

Gandom Nan گندم نان
- Village
- Location within Iran
- Coordinates: 38°57′33″N 46°52′14″E
- Country: Iran
- Province: East Azerbaijan
- County: Khoda Afarin
- Bakhsh: Minjavan
- Rural District: Minjavan-e Sharqi

Population (2006)
  - Total: 41
- Time zone: UTC+3:30 (IRST)
  - Summer (DST): UTC+4:30 (IRDT)

Gandom Nan (Persian: گندم نان, also Romanized as Gandom Nān; also known as Vārqān Kandī; in Armenian: Վարդանաշէն) is a village in Minjavan-e Sharqi Rural District, Minjavan District, Khoda Afarin County, East Azerbaijan Province, Iran. At the 2006 census, its population was 41, in 10 families.
