= Qarah Hasanlu-ye Khvajeh Pasha =

Qarah Hasanlu-ye Khvajeh Pasha قره حسنلو خواجه پاشا
- Village
- Location within Iran
- Coordinates: 37°32′58″N 45°10′47″E
- Country: Iran
- Province: West Azerbaijan
- County: Urmia
- Bakhsh: Central
- Rural District: Bakeshluchay

Population (2006)
  - Total: 220
- Time zone: UTC+3:30 (IRST)
  - Summer (DST): UTC+4:30 (IRDT)

Qarah Hasanlu-ye Khvajeh Pasha (Persian: قره حسنلو خواجه پاشا, romanized: Qarah Ḩasanlū-ye Khvājeh Pāshā; Syriac: Qārāsanlūi) (Note: Also known as Karassanlowive, Qarah Ḩasanlū-ye Qarah Pāshā, and Qareh Ḩasanlū.) is a village in Bakeshluchay Rural District, in the Central District of Urmia County, West Azerbaijan Province, Iran. As of the 2006 census it had a population of 220 divided into 69 families.

== History ==
Qārāsanlūi (today called Qarah Hasanlu-ye Khvajeh Pasha) was inhabited by 24 Church of the East Christian families in 1877 with no church or priest, as per Edward Lewes Cutts. Basil Nikitin recorded that the village was populated by Christians and Muslims just before the First World War. Prior to the First World War, there were 58 Assyrian houses at Qārāsanlūi, as per the list presented by Agha Petros to the Lausanne Peace Conference in 1922. It was located in the Baranduz District.

== Bibliography ==
- Gaunt, David (2006). Massacres, Resistance, Protectors: Muslim-Christian Relations in Eastern Anatolia during World War I. Gorgias Press.
- Wilmshurst, David (2000). The Ecclesiastical Organisation of the Church of the East, 1318–1913 (PDF). Peeters Publishers.
