= Shahrak-e Zeverdegan =

Shahrak-e Zeverdegan شهرك زوردگان
- Village
- Location within Iran
- Coordinates: 31°58′01″N 50°51′50″E
- Country: Iran
- Province: Chaharmahal and Bakhtiari
- County: Kiar
- Bakhsh: Central
- Rural District: Kiar-e Gharbi

Population (2006)
  - Total: 575
- Time zone: UTC+3:30 (IRST)
  - Summer (DST): UTC+4:30 (IRDT)

Shahrak-e Zeverdegan (Persian: شهرك زوردگان, also Romanized as Shahrak-e Zeverdegān; also known as Zeverdegān) is a village in Kiar-e Gharbi Rural District, in the Central District of Kiar County, Chaharmahal and Bakhtiari Province, Iran. At the 2006 census, its population was 575, in 130 families. The village is populated by Lurs.
