= Qalehlu =

Qalehlu قلعه لو
- Village
- Location within Iran
- Coordinates: 38°59′00″N 47°05′00″E
- Country: Iran
- Province: East Azerbaijan
- County: Kaleybar
- Bakhsh: Central
- Rural District: Mulan

Population (2006)
  - Total: 38
- Time zone: UTC+3:30 (IRST)
  - Summer (DST): UTC+4:30 (IRDT)

Qalehlu (Persian: قلعه لو, also Romanized as Qal‘ehlū) is a village in Mulan Rural District, in the Central District of Kaleybar County, East Azerbaijan Province, Iran. At the 2006 census, its population was 38, in 8 families.
