= Semsan =

Semsan سمسان
- Village
- Location within Iran
- Coordinates: 32°27′09″N 51°36′16″E
- Country: Iran
- Province: Isfahan
- County: Falavarjan
- Bakhsh: Pir Bakran
- Rural District: Garkan-e Shomali

Population (2006)
  - Total: 802
- Time zone: UTC+3:30 (IRST)
  - Summer (DST): UTC+4:30 (IRDT)

Semsan (Persian: سمسان, also Romanized as Semsān and Samsān; in Armenian: Սէմսուն) is a village in Garkan-e Shomali Rural District, Pir Bakran District, Falavarjan County, Isfahan Province, Iran. At the 2006 census, its population was 802, in 189 families.
