= Anhar-e Sofla =

Village in West Azerbaijan province, Iran

Anhar-e Sofla Persian: انهر سفلی
- Village
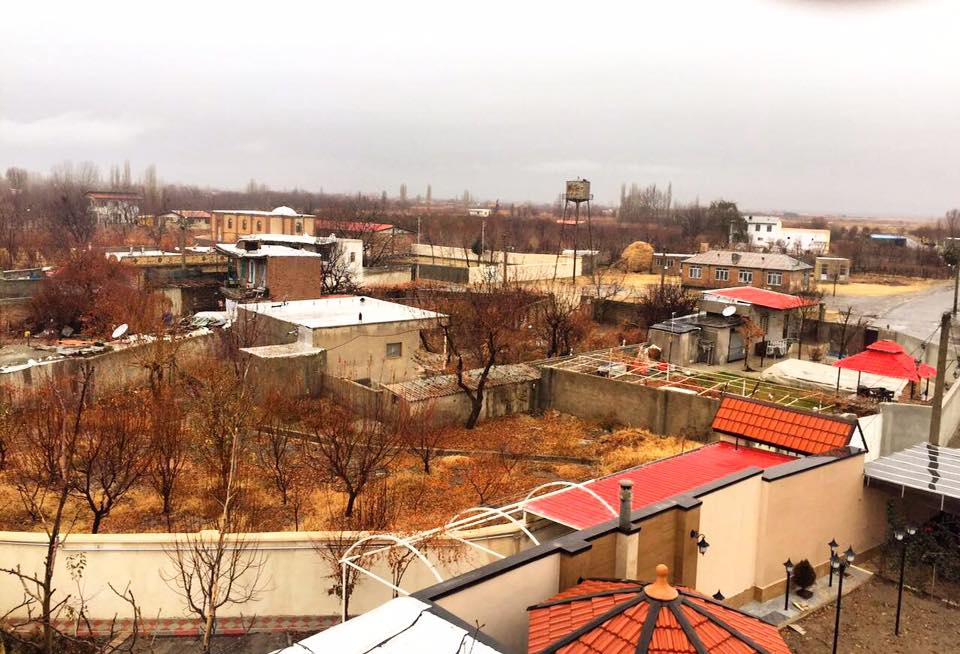
- The village of Anhar-e Sofla

- Location within Iran
- Coordinates: 37°35′29″N 44°58′32″E
- Country: Iran
- Province: West Azerbaijan
- County: Urmia
- District: Central
- Rural District: Rowzeh Chay

Population (2016)
  - Total: 901
- Time zone: UTC+3:30 (IRST)

Anhar-e Sofla (Persian: انهر سفلی) (Note: Also romanized as Anhar-e Soflá; also known as Anhar and Syriac: ܐܢܗܪ) is a village in Rowzeh Chay Rural District of the Central District in Urmia County, West Azerbaijan province, Iran.

Prior to the Assyrian genocide, the village was exclusively inhabited by Assyrians. It is known for its ancient church of Mart Maryam and its festival of Mar Gawra (shara d'Mar Gawra).

== Demographics ==
=== Population ===
At the time of the 2006 National Census, the village's population was 765 in 147 households. The following census in 2011 counted 754 people in 195 households. The 2016 census measured the population of the village as 901 people in 218 households.

== See also ==
- Assyrians in Iran
- List of Assyrian settlements
