= Kuchameshk =

Kuchameshk كوچمشك
- Village
- Location within Iran
- Coordinates: 38°08′59″N 44°47′25″E
- Country: Iran
- Province: West Azerbaijan
- County: Salmas
- Bakhsh: Central
- Rural District: Zulachay

Population (2006)
  - Total: 576
- Time zone: UTC+3:30 (IRST)
  - Summer (DST): UTC+4:30 (IRDT)

Kuchameshk (Persian: كوچمشك, also Romanized as Kūchameshk; also known as Kūchashmak; in Armenian: Քոչամիշ) is a village in Zulachay Rural District, in the Central District of Salmas County, West Azerbaijan Province, Iran. At the 2006 census, its population was 576, in 140 families.
