= Valendeh-ye Olya =

Village in West Azerbaijan province, Iran

Valendeh-ye Olya Persian: ولنده عليا
- Village
- Location within Iran
- Coordinates: 37°36′21″N 45°00′08″E
- Country: Iran
- Province: West Azerbaijan
- County: Urmia
- District: Central
- Rural District: Rowzeh Chay

Population (2016)
  - Total: 2,979
- Time zone: UTC+3:30 (IRST)

Valendeh-ye Olya (Persian: ولنده عليا) (Note: Also romanized as Valendeh-e ‘Olyā and Valendeh-ye ‘Olyā; formerly known as Valindeh-ye Olya (ولينده عليا), also romanized as Valīndeh-ye ‘Olyā) is a village in Rowzeh Chay Rural District of the Central District in Urmia County, West Azerbaijan province, Iran.

== Demographics ==
=== Population ===
At the time of the 2006 National Census, the village's population, as Valindeh-ye Olya, was 2,128 in 435 households. The following census in 2011 counted 2,442 people in 651 households, by which time the village ws listed as Valendeh-ye Olya. The 2016 census measured the population of the village as 2,979 people in 728 households.
