= Davudabad, Khomeyn =

Davudabad داوداباد
- Village
- Location within Iran
- Coordinates: 33°39′59″N 50°00′06″E
- Country: Iran
- Province: Markazi
- County: Khomeyn
- Bakhsh: Kamareh
- Rural District: Khorram Dasht

Population (2006)
  - Total: 183
- Time zone: UTC+3:30 (IRST)
  - Summer (DST): UTC+4:30 (IRDT)

Davudabad (Persian: داوداباد, also romanized as Dāvūdābād, Davood Abad, and Dāvodābād; also known as Dowtabād) is a village in Khorram Dasht Rural District, Kamareh District, Khomeyn County, Markazi Province, Iran. According to the 2006 census, its population was 183, with 53 families.
