= Qaraguz-e Salimaqa =

Qaraguz-e Salimaqa قراگوزسليم اقا
- Village
- Location within Iran
- Coordinates: 37°37′57″N 45°03′58″E
- Country: Iran
- Province: West Azerbaijan
- County: Urmia
- Bakhsh: Central
- Rural District: Nazluy-ye Jonubi

Population (2006)
  - Total: 182
- Time zone: UTC+3:30 (IRST)
  - Summer (DST): UTC+4:30 (IRDT)

Qaraguz-e Salimaqa (Persian: قراگوزسليم اقا, also Romanized as Qarāgūz-e Salīmāqā; in Armenian: Ղարագեոզ) is a village in Nazluy-ye Jonubi Rural District, in the Central District of Urmia County, West Azerbaijan Province, Iran. At the 2006 census, its population was 182, in 47 families.
