= Alik (daily) =

Armenian newspaper based in Iran

- Alik daily (12 September 2013)
- Type: Daily newspaper
- Editor: Terenik Melikian
- Language: Armenian
- Headquarters: Tehran
- Country: Iran
- Website: alikonline.ir

Alik (English: Wave) (Armenian: Ալիք) is an Armenian daily newspaper based in Tehran, Iran. It was founded in March 1931. Alik was initially a weekly, and beginning 1935 it started publishing once every two days. In 1941 it became a daily and has been published continuously. The editor in chief is Terenik Melikian.

The newspaper has its own publishing house and printing premises that publishes Armenian language and Iranian books. The newspaper has had various supplements including "Sharzhum", Student page, Literary section and "Page 404". Presently it continues publishing the "Khatchmerouk" youth supplement and "Mankakan Etch" for younger readers. In addition, Alik published the "Alik Monthly" (1961–1963) and "Alik Patanekan" youth biweekly.

Alik published a special book celebrating its 75th anniversary. It has its own building since 1998. The reported circulation is 4350 per issue.

== See also ==
- List of newspapers in Iran
