= Armedlu-ye Sofla =

Armedlu-ye Sofla ارمدلوسفلي
- Village
- Location within Iran
- Coordinates: 38°40′59″N 47°24′46″E
- Country: Iran
- Province: East Azerbaijan
- County: Ahar
- Bakhsh: Central
- Rural District: Vargahan

Population (2006)
  - Total: 22
- Time zone: UTC+3:30 (IRST)
  - Summer (DST): UTC+4:30 (IRDT)

Armedlu-ye Sofla (Persian: ارمدلوسفلي, romanized: Ārmedlū-ye Soflá, Armenian: Ամրադիլ, Էմրէդուլ; also known as Ārmatlū and Ārmedlū-ye Qadīm) is a village in Vargahan Rural District, in the Central District of Ahar County, East Azerbaijan Province, Iran. At the 2006 census, its population was 22, in 4 families.
