= Qareh Guz-e Il =

Qareh Guz-e Il قره گوزايل
- Village
- Location within Iran
- Coordinates: 37°38′36″N 45°05′29″E
- Country: Iran
- Province: West Azerbaijan
- County: Urmia
- Bakhsh: Central
- Rural District: Nazluy-ye Jonubi

Population (2006)
  - Total: 211
- Time zone: UTC+3:30 (IRST)
  - Summer (DST): UTC+4:30 (IRDT)

Qareh Guz-e Il (Persian: قره گوزايل, also Romanized as Qareh Gūz-e Īl; also known as Qarāgūz-e 'Īl) is a village in Nazluy-ye Jonubi Rural District, in the Central District of Urmia County, West Azerbaijan Province, Iran. At the 2006 census, its population was 211, in 65 families.
