= Baranduzchay-ye Jonubi Rural District =

Rural district in West Azerbaijan province, Iran

Baranduzchay-ye Jonubi Rural District Persian: دهستان باراندوزچای جنوبی
- Rural District
- Location within Iran
- Coordinates: 37°20′N 45°10′E
- Country: Iran
- Province: West Azerbaijan
- County: Urmia
- District: Central
- Established: 1987
- Capital: Balanej

Population (2016)
  - Total: 11,408
- Time zone: UTC+3:30 (IRST)

Baranduzchay-ye Jonubi Rural District (Persian: دهستان باراندوزچای جنوبی) is in the Central District of Urmia County, West Azerbaijan province, Iran. Its capital is the village of Balanej.

== Demographics ==
=== Population ===
At the time of the 2006 National Census, the rural district's population was 10,068 in 2,355 households. There were 9,416 inhabitants in 2,619 households at the following census of 2011. The 2016 census measured the population of the rural district as 11,408 in 3,117 households. The most populous of its 38 villages was Balanej, with 3,023 people.

=== Other villages in the rural district ===
- Darin Qaleh
- Hesar-e Agh Bolagh
- Kukiya
- Mahmudabad
- Mobarakabad
- Qasemlu
- Tulkan
- Tumatar
