= Jujil =

Village in Isfahan province, Iran

Jujil Persian: جوجيل
- Village
- Location within Iran
- Coordinates: 32°33′56″N 51°29′4″E
- Country: Iran
- Province: Isfahan
- County: Falavarjan
- District: Central
- Rural District: Abrisham

Population (2016)
  - Total: 6,372
- Time zone: UTC+3:30 (IRST)

Jujil (Persian: جوجيل) (Note: Also romanized as Joujil) is a village in Abrisham Rural District of the Central District in Falavarjan County, Isfahan province, Iran.

== Demographics ==
=== Population ===
At the time of the 2006 National Census, the village's population was 4,965 in 1,213 households, when it was in Zazeran Rural District of the Central District. The following census in 2011 counted 6,041 people in 1,635 households. The 2016 census measured the population of the village as 6,372 people in 1,771 households, by which time the rural district had been separated from the district in the formation of Qahderijan District. The village was transferred to Abrisham Rural District in the Central District. Jujil was the most populous village in its rural district.

== Transportation ==
For its public transit system, Jujil is served by Falavarjan County Municipalities Mass Transit Organization bus network Route 2 connecting it to Qahderijan, Falavarjan, and Isfahan, and Route 6 connecting it to Zazeran and Khomeinishahr.
