= Dashtchi =

Village in Isfahan province, Iran

Dashtchi Persian: دشتچي
- Village
- Location within Iran
- Coordinates: 32°33′48″N 51°29′32″E
- Country: Iran
- Province: Isfahan
- County: Falavarjan
- District: Central
- Rural District: Abrisham

Population (2016)
  - Total: 1,965
- Time zone: UTC+3:30 (IRST)

Dashtchi (Persian: دشتچي) (Note: Also romanized as Dashtchī) is a village in Abrisham Rural District of the Central District in Falavarjan County, Isfahan province, Iran.

== Demographics ==
=== Population ===
At the time of the 2006 National Census, the village's population was 1,668 in 431 households, when it was in Zazeran Rural District of the Central District. The following census in 2011 counted 1,868 people in 497 households. The 2016 census measured the population of the village as 1,965 people in 545 households, by which time the rural district had been separated from the district in the formation of Qahderijan District. Dashtchi was transferred to Abrisham Rural District in the Central District.
