= Kafoshan =

Village in Isfahan province, Iran

Kafoshan Persian: كافشان
- Village
- Location within Iran
- Coordinates: 32°34′26″N 51°29′57″E
- Country: Iran
- Province: Isfahan
- County: Falavarjan
- District: Central
- Rural District: Abrisham

Population (2016)
  - Total: 1,937
- Time zone: UTC+3:30 (IRST)

Kafoshan (Persian: كافشان) (Note: Also romanized as Kāfoshān; also known as Gāh Fashān, Gāh Foshān, Kāh Fashān, and Kāpāsān; in Armenian: Քափաշան)) is a village in Abrisham Rural District of the Central District in Falavarjan County, Isfahan province, Iran.

== Demographics ==
=== Population ===
At the time of the 2006 National Census, the village's population was 1,655 in 443 households, when it was in Zazeran Rural District of the Central District. The following census in 2011 counted 1,923 people in 580 households. The 2016 census measured the population of the village as 1,937 people in 606 households, by which time the rural district had been separated from the district in the formation of Qahderijan District. Kafoshan was transferred to Abrisham Rural District in the Central District.
