= Koruj, Isfahan =

Village in Isfahan province, Iran

Koruj Persian: كروج
- Village
- Location within Iran
- Coordinates: 32°31′59″N 51°29′07″E
- Country: Iran
- Province: Isfahan
- County: Falavarjan
- District: Central
- Rural District: Ashtarjan

Population (2016)
  - Total: 1,693
- Time zone: UTC+3:30 (IRST)

Koruj (Persian: كروج) (Note: Also romanized as Korūj; also known as Kūroch; in Armenian: Քարուջ) is a village in Ashtarjan Rural District of the Central District in Falavarjan County, Isfahan province, Iran.

== Demographics ==
=== Population ===
At the time of the 2006 National Census, the village's population was 1,654 in 447 households, when it was in Golestan Rural District of the Central District. The following census in 2011 counted 1,716 people in 510 households. The 2016 census measured the population of the village as 1,693 people in 564 households, by which time the rural district had been separated from the district in the formation of Qahderijan District. Koruj was transferred to Ashtarjan Rural District of the Central District.
