= Kheyrabad, Falavarjan =

Village in Isfahan province, Iran

Kheyrabad Persian: خيراباد
- Village
- Location within Iran
- Coordinates: 32°31′21″N 51°30′08″E
- Country: Iran
- Province: Isfahan
- County: Falavarjan
- District: Central
- Rural District: Ashtarjan

Population (2016)
  - Total: 819
- Time zone: UTC+3:30 (IRST)

Kheyrabad (Persian: خيراباد) (Note: Also romanized as Kheyrābād; also known as Kheyrābād-e Kūhcheh) is a village in Ashtarjan Rural District of the Central District in Falavarjan County, Isfahan province, Iran.

== Demographics ==
=== Population ===
At the time of the 2006 National Census, the village's population was 767 in 209 households, when it was in Golestan Rural District of the Central District. The following census in 2011 counted 830 people in 257 households. The 2016 census measured the population of the village as 819 people in 280 households, by which time the rural district had been separated from the district in the formation of Qahderijan District. Kheyrabad was transferred to Ashtarjan Rural District of the Central District.
