= Dashtlu =

Village in Isfahan province, Iran

Dashtlu Persian: دشتلو
- Village
- Location within Iran
- Coordinates: 32°31′34″N 51°29′37″E
- Country: Iran
- Province: Isfahan
- County: Falavarjan
- District: Central
- Rural District: Ashtarjan

Population (2016)
  - Total: 863
- Time zone: UTC+3:30 (IRST)

Dashtlu (Persian: دشتلو) (Note: Also romanized as Dasht Lū and Dashtlū) is a village in Ashtarjan Rural District of the Central District in Falavarjan County, Isfahan province, Iran.

== Demographics ==
=== Population ===
At the time of the 2006 National Census, the village's population was 838 in 223 households, when it was in Golestan Rural District of the Central District. The following census in 2011 counted 902 people in 271 households. The 2016 census measured the population of the village as 863 people in 277 households, by which time the rural district had been separated from the district in the formation of Qahderijan District. Dashtlu was transferred to Ashtarjan Rural District of the Central District.
