= Qaleh-ye Amir =

Village in Isfahan province, Iran

Qaleh-ye Amir Persian: قلعه امير
- Village
- Location within Iran
- Coordinates: 32°31′33″N 51°27′34″E
- Country: Iran
- Province: Isfahan
- County: Falavarjan
- District: Qahderijan
- Rural District: Golestan

Population (2016)
  - Total: 1,738
- Time zone: UTC+3:30 (IRST)

Qaleh-ye Amir (Persian: قلعه امير) (Note: Also romanized as Qal‘eh-ye Amīr; also known as Qal‘eh Amīrīyeh, Qal‘eh Mīr, Qal‘eh-e Mīr, and Qal‘eh-ye Mīr) is a village in, and the capital of, Golestan Rural District in Qahderijan District of Falavarjan County, Isfahan province, Iran. The previous capital of the rural district was the village of Shervedan (now in Ashtarjan Rural District of the Central District), before which its capital was the village of Garmaseh.

== Demographics ==
=== Population ===
At the time of the 2006 National Census, the village's population was 1,592 in 419 households, when it was in the Central District. The following census in 2011 counted 1,657 people in 490 households. The 2016 census measured the population of the village as 1,738 people in 539 households, by which time the rural district had been separated from the district in the formation of Qahderijan District. Qaleh-ye Amir was the most populous village in its rural district.
