= Bondart =

Village in Isfahan province, Iran

Bondart Persian: بندارت
- Village
- Location within Iran
- Coordinates: 32°30′58″N 51°29′27″E
- Country: Iran
- Province: Isfahan
- County: Falavarjan
- District: Central
- Rural District: Ashtarjan

Population (2016)
  - Total: 1,401
- Time zone: UTC+3:30 (IRST)

Bondart (Persian: بندارت) (Note: Also romanized as Bondārt; in Armenian: Բոնդարդ) is a village in Ashtarjan Rural District of the Central District in Falavarjan County, Isfahan province, Iran.

== Demographics ==
=== Population ===
At the time of the 2006 National Census, the village's population was 1,338 in 339 households, when it was in Golestan Rural District of the Central District. The following census in 2011 counted 1,405 people in 399 households. The 2016 census measured the population of the village as 1,401 people in 419 households, by which time the rural district had been separated from the district in the formation of Qahderijan District. Bondart was transferred to Ashtarjan Rural District of the Central District.
