= Riyakhun =

Village in Isfahan province, Iran

Riyakhun Persian: رياخون
- Village
- Location within Iran
- Coordinates: 32°34′31″N 51°30′57″E
- Country: Iran
- Province: Isfahan
- County: Falavarjan
- District: Central
- Rural District: Abrisham

Population (2016)
  - Total: 1,496
- Time zone: UTC+3:30 (IRST)

Riyakhun (Persian: رياخون) (Note: Also romanized as Rīākhūn and Rīyākhūn; also known as Rīākhān) is a village in Abrisham Rural District of the Central District in Falavarjan County, Isfahan province, Iran.

== Demographics ==
=== Population ===
At the time of the 2006 National Census, the village's population was 1,482 in 379 households, when it was in Zazeran Rural District of the Central District. The following census in 2011 counted 1,578 people in 451 households. The 2016 census measured the population of the village as 1,496 people in 459 households, by which time the rural district had been separated from the district in the formation of Qahderijan District. Riyakhun was transferred to Abrisham Rural District in the Central District.
