= Karuyeh =

Village in Isfahan province, Iran

Karuyeh Persian: كارويه
- Village
- Location within Iran
- Coordinates: 32°29′57″N 51°28′44″E
- Country: Iran
- Province: Isfahan
- County: Falavarjan
- District: Qahderijan
- Rural District: Golestan

Population (2016)
  - Total: 1,031
- Time zone: UTC+3:30 (IRST)

Karuyeh (Persian: كارويه) (Note: Also romanized as Kāravīeh and Kārūyeh; also known as Karveh) is a village in Golestan Rural District in Qahderijan District of Falavarjan County, Isfahan province, Iran.

== Demographics ==
=== Population ===
At the time of the 2006 National Census, the village's population was 1,096 in 281 households, when it was in the Central District. The following census in 2011 counted 1,150 people in 335 households. The 2016 census measured the population of the village as 1,031 people in 324 households, by which time the rural district had been separated from the district in the formation of Qahderijan District.
