= Largichi =

Neighborhood in Isfahan province, Iran

Largichi Persian: لارگيچي
- Neighborhood
- Country: Iran
- Province: Isfahan
- County: Falavarjan
- District: Central
- City: Bostan Zar

Population (2006)
  - Total: 589
- Time zone: UTC+3:30 (IRST)

Largichi (Persian: لارگيچي) (Note: Also romanized as Lārgīchī) is a neighborhood in the city of Bostan Zar in the Central District of Falavarjan County, Isfahan province, Iran.

== Demographics ==
=== Population ===
At the time of the 2006 National Census, Largichi's population was 589 in 154 households, when it was a village in Ashtarjan Rural District.

In 2008, the villages of Dorcheh Abed, Hajjiabad, Largan, and Largichi were merged to form the new village of Bostan, which was converted to a city and renamed Bostan Zar in 2021.
