= Hajjiabad, Falavarjan =

Neighborhood in Isfahan province, Iran

Hajjiabad Persian: حاجی‌آباد
- Neighborhood
- Location within Iran
- Coordinates: 32°30′12″N 51°30′10″E
- Country: Iran
- Province: Isfahan
- County: Falavarjan
- District: Central
- City: Bostan Zar

Population (2006)
  - Total: 773
- Time zone: UTC+3:30 (IRST)

Hajjiabad (Persian: حاجی‌آباد) (Note: Also romanized as Ḩājjīābād) is a neighborhood in the city of Bostan Zar in the Central District of Falavarjan County, Isfahan province, Iran.

== Demographics ==
=== Population ===
At the time of the 2006 National Census, Hajjiabad's population was 773 in 195 households, when it was a village in Ashtarjan Rural District.

In 2008, the villages of Dorcheh Abed, Hajjiabad, Largan, and Largichi were merged to form the new village of Bostan, which was converted to a city and renamed Bostan Zar in 2021.
