= Dar Afshan, Ashtarjan =

Village in Isfahan province, Iran

Dar Afshan Persian: دارافشان
- Village
- Location within Iran
- Coordinates: 32°30′54″N 51°29′15″E
- Country: Iran
- Province: Isfahan
- County: Falavarjan
- District: Central
- Rural District: Ashtarjan

Population (2016)
  - Total: 1,037
- Time zone: UTC+3:30 (IRST)

Dar Afshan (Persian: دارافشان) (Note: Also romanized as Dār Āfshān; also known as Dārūn) is a village in Ashtarjan Rural District of the Central District in Falavarjan County, Isfahan province, Iran.

== Demographics ==
=== Population ===
At the time of the 2006 National Census, the village's population was 1,006 in 260 households, when it was in Golestan Rural District of the Central District. The following census in 2011 counted 1,092 people in 317 households. The 2016 census measured the population of the village as 1,037 people in 321 households, by which time the rural district had been separated from the district in the formation of Qahderijan District. Dar Afshan was transferred to Ashtarjan Rural District of the Central District.
