= Huyyeh, Isfahan =

Village in Isfahan province, Iran

Huyyeh Persian: هويه
- Village
- Location within Iran
- Coordinates: 32°34′57″N 51°31′29″E
- Country: Iran
- Province: Isfahan
- County: Falavarjan
- District: Central
- Rural District: Abrisham

Population (2016)
  - Total: 2,698
- Time zone: UTC+3:30 (IRST)

Huyyeh (Persian: هويه) (Note: Also romanized as Hūyeh and Hūyyeh) is a village in Abrisham Rural District of the Central District in Falavarjan County, Isfahan province, Iran.

== Demographics ==
=== Population ===
At the time of the 2006 National Census, the village's population was 2,698 in 716 households, when it was in Zazeran Rural District of the Central District. The following census in 2011 counted 3,003 people in 885 households. The 2016 census measured the population of the village as 2,698 people in 896 households, by which time the rural district had been separated from the district in the formation of Qahderijan District. Huyyeh was transferred to Abrisham Rural District in the Central District.
