= Shervedan =

Village in Isfahan province, Iran

Shervedan Persian: شرودان
- Village
- Location within Iran
- Coordinates: 32°32′21″N 51°29′21″E
- Country: Iran
- Province: Isfahan
- County: Falavarjan
- District: Central
- Rural District: Ashtarjan

Population (2016)
  - Total: 3,359
- Time zone: UTC+3:30 (IRST)

Shervedan (Persian: شرودان) (Note: Also romanized as Shervedān; also known as Shervehdān and Shīrvedān) is a village in Ashtarjan Rural District of the Central District in Falavarjan County, Isfahan province, Iran. It was the capital of Golestan Rural District until its capital was transferred to the village of Qaleh-ye Amir.

== Demographics ==
=== Population ===
At the time of the 2006 National Census, the village's population was 3,114 in 808 households, when it was in Golestan Rural District of the Central District. The following census in 2011 counted 3,419 people in 986 households. The 2016 census measured the population of the village as 3,359 people in 1,049 households, by which time the rural district had been separated from the district in the formation of Qahderijan District. Kheyrabad was transferred to Ashtarjan Rural District of the Central District.
