= Jalalabad-e Marbin =

Village in Isfahan province, Iran

Jalalabad-e Marbin Persian: جلال اباد ماربين
- Village
- Location within Iran
- Coordinates: 32°36′48″N 51°30′28″E
- Country: Iran
- Province: Isfahan
- County: Falavarjan
- District: Qahderijan
- Rural District: Zazeran

Population (2016)
  - Total: 1,985
- Time zone: UTC+3:30 (IRST)

Jalalabad-e Marbin (Persian: جلال اباد ماربين) (Note: Also romanized as Jalālābād-e Mārbīn; also known as Jalālābād) is a village in Zazeran Rural District of Qahderijan District in Falavarjan County, Isfahan province, Iran.

== Demographics ==
=== Population ===
At the time of the 2006 National Census, the village's population was 1,775 in 462 households, when it was in the Central District. The following census in 2011 counted 1,887 people in 590 households. The 2016 census measured the population of the village as 1,985 people in 640 households, by which time the rural district had been separated from the district in the formation of Qahderijan District. Of the rural district's 10 villages, only Jalalabad-e Marbin reported a population, with 1,985 people.
