= Esfahran =

Village in Isfahan province, Iran

Esfahran Persian: اسفهران
- Village
- Location within Iran
- Coordinates: 32°31′05″N 51°28′29″E
- Country: Iran
- Province: Isfahan
- County: Falavarjan
- District: Qahderijan
- Rural District: Golestan

Population (2016)
  - Total: 1,171
- Time zone: UTC+3:30 (IRST)

Esfahran (Persian: اسفهران) (Note: Also romanized as Esfahrān) is a village in Golestan Rural District in Qahderijan District of Falavarjan County, Isfahan province, Iran.

== Demographics ==
=== Population ===
At the time of the 2006 National Census, the village's population was 1,026 in 261 households, when it was in the Central District. The following census in 2011 counted 1,063 people in 317 households. The 2016 census measured the population of the village as 1,171 people in 367 households, by which time the rural district had been separated from the district in the formation of Qahderijan District.
