= Venhar =

Village in Isfahan province, Iran

Venhar Persian: ونهر
- Village
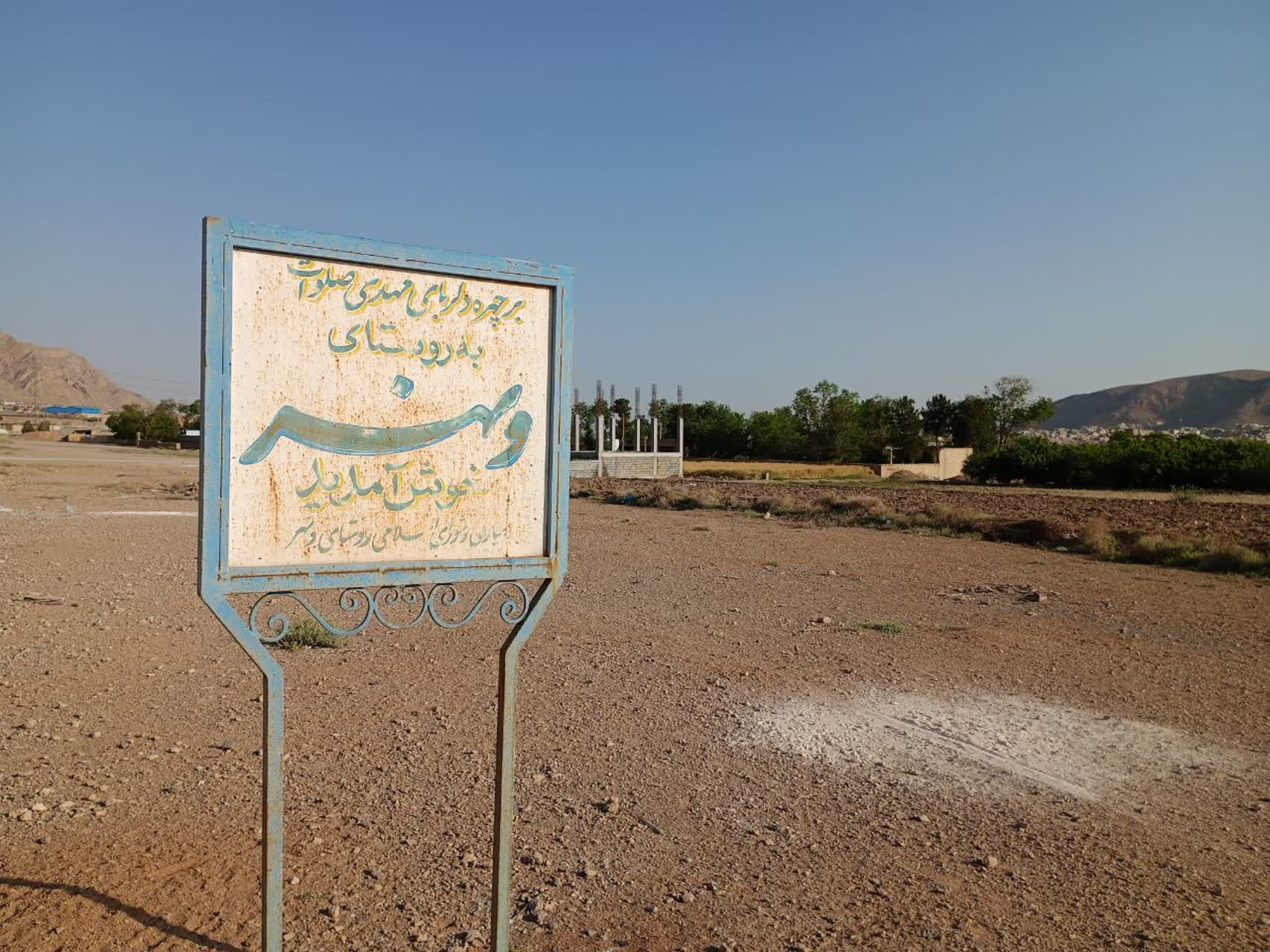
- Entrance to the village of Venhar

- Location within Iran
- Coordinates: 32°26′26″N 51°31′17″E
- Country: Iran
- Province: Isfahan
- County: Falavarjan
- District: Pir Bakran
- Rural District: Sohr and Firuzan

Population (2016)
  - Total: 971
- Time zone: UTC+3:30 (IRST)

Venhar (Persian: ونهر) is a village in Sohr and Firuzan Rural District of Pir Bakran District (Note: Formerly Garkan-e Shomali District) in Falavarjan County, Isfahan province, Iran.

== Demographics ==
=== Population ===
At the time of the 2006 National Census, the village's population was 920 in 257 households. The following census in 2011 counted 993 people in 305 households. The 2016 census measured the population of the village as 971 people in 307 households.
