= Golgun, Isfahan =

Village in Isfahan province, Iran

Golgun Persian: گلگون
- Village
- Location within Iran
- Coordinates: 32°26′12″N 51°32′35″E
- Country: Iran
- Province: Isfahan
- County: Falavarjan
- District: Pir Bakran
- Rural District: Sohr and Firuzan

Population (2016)
  - Total: 284
- Time zone: UTC+3:30 (IRST)

Golgun (Persian: گلگون) (Note: Also romanized as Golgūn; also known as Kolgūn) is a village in Sohr and Firuzan Rural District of Pir Bakran District (Note: Formerly Garkan-e Shomali District) in Falavarjan County, Isfahan province, Iran.

== Demographics ==
=== Population ===
At the time of the 2006 National Census, the village's population was 265 in 73 households. The following census in 2011 counted 282 people in 87 households. The 2016 census measured the population of the village as 284 people in 95 households.
