= Shah Shams ol Din =

Village in Isfahan province, Iran

Shah Shams ol Din Persian: شاه شمس الدين
- Village
- Location within Iran
- Country: Iran
- Province: Isfahan
- County: Falavarjan
- District: Pir Bakran
- Rural District: Sohr and Firuzan

Population (2016)
  - Total: 111
- Time zone: UTC+3:30 (IRST)

Shah Shams ol Din (Persian: شاه شمس الدين) (Note: Also romanized as Shāh Shams ol Dīn; also known as Shāh Shams-od-dīn) is a village in Sohr and Firuzan Rural District of Pir Bakran District (Note: Formerly Garkan-e Shomali District) in Falavarjan County, Isfahan province, Iran.

== Demographics ==
=== Population ===
At the time of the 2006 National Census, the village's population was 56 in 11 households. The following census in 2011 counted 86 people in 23 households. The 2016 census measured the population of the village as 111 people in 31 households.
