= Nargan =

Nargan (Persian: نرگان) may refer to:

- Nargan, Isfahan
- Nargan, Sistan and Baluchestan
