= Musiyan, Isfahan =

Village in Isfahan province, Iran

Musiyan Persian: موسيان
- Village
- Location within Iran
- Coordinates: 32°34′20″N 51°31′55″E
- Country: Iran
- Province: Isfahan
- County: Falavarjan
- District: Central
- Rural District: Abrisham

Population (2016)
  - Total: 1,596
- Time zone: UTC+3:30 (IRST)

Musiyan (Persian: موسيان) (Note: Also romanized as Musian, Mūsīān, and Mūsīyān) is a village in Abrisham Rural District of the Central District in Falavarjan County, Isfahan province, Iran.

== Demographics ==
=== Population ===
At the time of the 2006 National Census, the village's population was 1,478 in 373 households. The following census in 2011 counted 1,649 people in 471 households. The 2016 census measured the population of the village as 1,596 people in 468 households.
