= Hoseynabad, Falavarjan =

Village in Isfahan province, Iran

Hoseynabad Persian: حسين اباد
- Village
- Location within Iran
- Coordinates: 32°35′02″N 51°32′41″E
- Country: Iran
- Province: Isfahan
- County: Falavarjan
- District: Central
- Rural District: Abrisham

Population (2016)
  - Total: 2,380
- Time zone: UTC+3:30 (IRST)

Hoseynabad (Persian: حسين اباد) (Note: Also romanized as Ḩoseynābād; also known as Ḩasanābād) is a village in Abrisham Rural District of the Central District in Falavarjan County, Isfahan province, Iran.

== Demographics ==
=== Population ===
At the time of the 2006 National Census, the village's population was 1,892 in 479 households. The following census in 2011 counted 2,178 people in 657 households. The 2016 census measured the population of the village as 2,380 people in 748 households.
