= Cham Rud, Isfahan =

Village in Isfahan province, Iran

Cham Rud Persian: چم رود
- Village
- Location within Iran
- Coordinates: 32°28′26″N 51°31′32″E
- Country: Iran
- Province: Isfahan
- County: Falavarjan
- District: Pir Bakran
- Rural District: Sohr and Firuzan

Population (2016)
  - Total: 624
- Time zone: UTC+3:30 (IRST)

Cham Rud (Persian: چم رود) (Note: Also romanized as Cham Rūd; also known as Cham) is a village in Sohr and Firuzan Rural District of Pir Bakran District (Note: Formerly Garkan-e Shomali District) in Falavarjan County, Isfahan province, Iran.

== Demographics ==
=== Population ===
At the time of the 2006 National Census, the village's population was 603 in 167 households. The following census in 2011 counted 659 people in 198 households. The 2016 census measured the population of the village as 624 people in 208 households.
