= Rara, Iran =

Village in Isfahan province, Iran

Rara Persian: رارا
- Village
- Location within Iran
- Coordinates: 32°29′22″N 51°32′56″E
- Country: Iran
- Province: Isfahan
- County: Falavarjan
- District: Pir Bakran
- Rural District: Garkan-e Shomali

Population (2016)
  - Total: 1,623
- Time zone: UTC+3:30 (IRST)

Rara (Persian: رارا) (Note: Also romanized as Rārā) is a village in Garkan-e Shomali Rural District of Pir Bakran District (Note: Formerly Garkan-e Shomali District) in Falavarjan County, Isfahan province, Iran.

== Demographics ==
=== Population ===
At the time of the 2006 National Census, the village's population was 1,595 in 425 households. The following census in 2011 counted 1,744 people in 534 households. The 2016 census measured the population of the village as 1,623 people in 529 households.
