= Bejgerd =

Village in Isfahan province, Iran

Bejgerd Persian: بجگرد
- Village
- Location within Iran
- Coordinates: 32°29′03″N 51°30′59″E
- Country: Iran
- Province: Isfahan
- County: Falavarjan
- District: Pir Bakran
- Rural District: Sohr and Firuzan

Population (2016)
  - Total: 1,481
- Time zone: UTC+3:30 (IRST)

Bejgerd (Persian: بجگرد) is a village in Sohr and Firuzan Rural District of Pir Bakran District (Note: Formerly Garkan-e Shomali District) in Falavarjan County, Isfahan province, Iran.

== Demographics ==
=== Population ===
At the time of the 2006 National Census, the village's population was 1,511 in 377 households. The following census in 2011 counted 1,602 people in 463 households. The 2016 census measured the population of the village as 1,481 people in 473 households.
