= Khvansarak =

Village in Isfahan province, Iran

Khvansarak Persian: خوانسارك
- Village
- Location within Iran
- Coordinates: 32°28′18″N 51°34′51″E
- Country: Iran
- Province: Isfahan
- County: Falavarjan
- District: Pir Bakran
- Rural District: Garkan-e Shomali

Population (2016)
  - Total: 1,441
- Time zone: UTC+3:30 (IRST)

Khvansarak (Persian: خوانسارك) (Note: Also romanized as Khvānsārak; ; also known as Khūnsārak, Khvānsarak, and Khvonsārak; in Armenian: Խունսարէք) is a village in Garkan-e Shomali Rural District of Pir Bakran District (Note: Formerly Garkan-e Shomali District) in Falavarjan County, Isfahan province, Iran.

== Demographics ==
=== Population ===
At the time of the 2006 National Census, the village's population was 1,732 in 425 households. The following census in 2011 counted 1,760 people in 491 households. The 2016 census measured the population of the village as 1,441 people in 453 households.
