= Filergan =

Village in Isfahan province, Iran

Filergan Persian: فيلرگان
- Village
- Location within Iran
- Coordinates: 32°28′46″N 51°31′37″E
- Country: Iran
- Province: Isfahan
- County: Falavarjan
- District: Pir Bakran
- Rural District: Sohr and Firuzan

Population (2016)
  - Total: 518
- Time zone: UTC+3:30 (IRST)

Filergan (Persian: فيلرگان) (Note: Also romanized as Fīlergān; also known as Fīlevarjān, Fīlūrjān, and Pīlergān) is a village in Sohr and Firuzan Rural District of Pir Bakran District (Note: Formerly Garkan-e Shomali District) in Falavarjan County, Isfahan province, Iran.

== Demographics ==
=== Population ===
At the time of the 2006 National Census, the village's population was 562 in 138 households. The following census in 2011 counted 540 people in 154 households. The 2016 census measured the population of the village as 518 people in 158 households.
