= Mehregan, Isfahan =

Village in Isfahan province, Iran

Mehregan Persian: مهرگان
- Village
- Location within Iran
- Coordinates: 32°28′15″N 51°36′28″E
- Country: Iran
- Province: Isfahan
- County: Falavarjan
- District: Pir Bakran
- Rural District: Garkan-e Shomali

Population (2016)
  - Total: 1,222
- Time zone: UTC+3:30 (IRST)

Mehregan (Persian: مهرگان) (Note: Also romanized as Mehregān; also known as Mehrejān) is a village in Garkan-e Shomali Rural District of Pir Bakran District (Note: Formerly Garkan-e Shomali District) in Falavarjan County, Isfahan province, Iran.

== Demographics ==
=== Population ===
At the time of the 2006 National Census, the village's population was 1,265 in 323 households. The following census in 2011 counted 1,438 people in 376 households. The 2016 census measured the population of the village as 1,222 people in 367 households.
