= Ali Shahedan =

Village in Isfahan province, Iran

Ali Shahedan Persian: علي شاهدان
- Village
- Location within Iran
- Coordinates: 32°29′24″N 51°34′49″E
- Country: Iran
- Province: Isfahan
- County: Falavarjan
- District: Pir Bakran
- Rural District: Garkan-e Shomali

Population (2016)
  - Total: 1,334
- Time zone: UTC+3:30 (IRST)

Ali Shahedan (Persian: علي شاهدان) (Note: Also romanized as ‘Alī Shāhedān and Alī Shāhedān) is a village in Garkan-e Shomali Rural District of Pir Bakran District (Note: Formerly Garkan-e Shomali District) in Falavarjan County, Isfahan province, Iran.

== Demographics ==
=== Population ===
At the time of the 2006 National Census, the village's population was 1,367 in 364 households. The following census in 2011 counted 1,497 people in 438 households. The 2016 census measured the population of the village as 1,334 people in 426 households.
