= Sohr and Firuzan =

Village in Isfahan province, Iran

Sohr and Firuzan Persian: سهر و فيروزان
- Village
- Location within Iran
- Coordinates: 32°27′23″N 51°31′58″E
- Country: Iran
- Province: Isfahan
- County: Falavarjan
- District: Pir Bakran
- Rural District: Sohr and Firuzan

Population (2016)
  - Total: 2,935
- Time zone: UTC+3:30 (IRST)

Sohr and Firuzan (Persian: سهر و فيروزان) (Note: Also romanized as Sohr va Fīrūzān; also known as Fīrūzān, Safiruzān, Safīvazān, Sohr Fīrūzān, and Sohr-e Fīrūzān) is a village in, and the capital of, Sohr and Firuzan Rural District in Pir Bakran District (Note: Formerly Garkan-e Shomali District) of Falavarjan County, Isfahan province, Iran.

== Demographics ==
=== Population ===
At the time of the 2006 National Census, the village's population was 3,628 in 1,030 households. The following census in 2011 counted 3,580 people in 1,124 households. The 2016 census measured the population of the village as 2,935 people in 1,013 households.
