= Mehranjan =

Mehranjan or Mehrenjan (Persian: مهرنجان) may refer to:

- Mehrenjan, Kazerun, Fars Province
- Mehrenjan, Mamasani, Fars Province
- Mehranjan-e Arameneh, Isfahan Province
- Mehrenjan-e Otrak, Isfahan Province
