= Jowlarestan =

Village in Isfahan province, Iran

Jowlarestan Persian: جولرستان
- Village
- Location within Iran
- Coordinates: 32°34′53″N 51°32′47″E
- Country: Iran
- Province: Isfahan
- County: Falavarjan
- District: Central
- Rural District: Abrisham

Population (2016)
  - Total: 3,186
- Time zone: UTC+3:30 (IRST)

Jowlarestan (Persian: جولرستان) (Note: Also romanized as Jowlarestān; also known as Jolarestān) is a village in Abrisham Rural District of the Central District in Falavarjan County, Isfahan province, Iran.

== Demographics ==
=== Population ===
At the time of the 2006 National Census, the village's population was 2,473 in 679 households. The following census in 2011 counted 2,837 people in 871 households. The 2016 census measured the population of the village as 3,186 people in 997 households.
