= Kersegan =

Village in Isfahan province, Iran

Kersegan Persian: كرسگان
- Village
- Location within Iran
- Coordinates: 32°34′34″N 51°33′00″E
- Country: Iran
- Province: Isfahan
- County: Falavarjan
- District: Central
- Rural District: Abrisham

Population (2016)
  - Total: 3,864
- Time zone: UTC+3:30 (IRST)

Kersegan (Persian: كرسگان) (Note: Also romanized as Kersegān; also known as Karaskān) is a village in Abrisham Rural District of the Central District in Falavarjan County, Isfahan province, Iran.

== Demographics ==
=== Population ===
At the time of the 2006 National Census, the village's population was 3,539 in 904 households. The following census in 2011 counted 4,100 people in 1,139 households. The 2016 census measured the population of the village as 3,864 people in 1,146 households.
