= Largan, Isfahan =

Neighborhood in Isfahan province, Iran

Largan Persian: لارگان
- Neighborhood
- Location within Iran
- Coordinates: 32°29′36″N 51°30′45″E
- Country: Iran
- Province: Isfahan
- County: Falavarjan
- District: Central
- City: Bostan Zar

Population (2006)
  - Total: 2,259
- Time zone: UTC+3:30 (IRST)

Largan (Persian: لارگان) (Note: Also romanized as Lārgān and Lāregān) is a neighborhood in the city of Bostan Zar in the Central District of Falavarjan County, Isfahan province, Iran.

== Demographics ==
=== Population ===
At the time of the 2006 National Census, Largan's population was 2,259 in 598 households, when it was a village in Ashtarjan Rural District.

In 2008, the villages of Dorcheh Abed, Hajjiabad, Largan, and Largichi were merged to form the new village of Bostan, which was converted to a city and renamed Bostan Zar in 2021.
