= Mohammadiyeh, Falavarjan =

Village in Isfahan province, Iran

Mohammadiyeh Persian: محمديه
- Village
- Location within Iran
- Coordinates: 32°29′45″N 51°29′42″E
- Country: Iran
- Province: Isfahan
- County: Falavarjan
- District: Central
- Rural District: Ashtarjan

Population (2016)
  - Total: 1,247
- Time zone: UTC+3:30 (IRST)

Mohammadiyeh (Persian: محمديه) (Note: Also romanized as Moḩammadīyeh; formerly known as Mamed (ممد)) is a village in Ashtarjan Rural District of the Central District in Falavarjan County, Isfahan province, Iran.

== Demographics ==
=== Population ===
At the time of the 2006 National Census, the village's population was 1,358 in 337 households. The following census in 2011 counted 1,462 people in 410 households. The 2016 census measured the population of the village as 1,247 people in 411 households.
