= Siah Afshar =

Village in Isfahan province, Iran

Siah Afshar Persian: سياه افشار
- Village
- Location within Iran
- Coordinates: 32°29′55″N 51°33′56″E
- Country: Iran
- Province: Isfahan
- County: Falavarjan
- District: Pir Bakran
- Rural District: Garkan-e Shomali

Population (2016)
  - Total: 1,279
- Time zone: UTC+3:30 (IRST)

Siah Afshar (Persian: سياه افشار) (Note: Also romanized as Sīāh Afshār; also known as Seyāfshād, Sīā Afshār, and Sīāfshū) is a village in Garkan-e Shomali Rural District of Pir Bakran District (Note: Formerly Garkan-e Shomali District) in Falavarjan County, Isfahan province, Iran.

== Demographics ==
=== Population ===
At the time of the 2006 National Census, the village's population was 1,261 in 353 households. The following census in 2011 counted 1,307 people in 412 households. The 2016 census measured the population of the village as 1,279 people in 419 households.
