= Zefreh, Falavarjan =

Village in Isfahan province, Iran

Zefreh Persian: زفره
- Village
- Location within Iran
- Coordinates: 32°30′15″N 51°29′46″E
- Country: Iran
- Province: Isfahan
- County: Falavarjan
- District: Central
- Rural District: Ashtarjan

Population (2016)
  - Total: 4,003
- Time zone: UTC+3:30 (IRST)

Zefreh (Persian: زفره) (Note: Also romanized as Zafreh) is a village in Ashtarjan Rural District of the Central District in Falavarjan County, Isfahan province, Iran.

== Demographics ==
=== Population ===
At the time of the 2006 National Census, the village's population was 3,891 in 991 households. The following census in 2011 counted 4,095 people in 1,168 households. The 2016 census measured the population of the village as 4,003 people in 1,239 households.
