= Ardal and Safiabad =

Village in Isfahan province, Iran

Ardal and Safiabad Persian: اردال و صفي آباد
- Village
- Location within Iran
- Coordinates: 32°29′01″N 51°31′27″E
- Country: Iran
- Province: Isfahan
- County: Falavarjan
- District: Pir Bakran
- Rural District: Sohr and Firuzan

Population (2016)
  - Total: 691
- Time zone: UTC+3:30 (IRST)

Ardal and Safiabad (Persian: اردال و صفي آباد) (Note: Also romanized as Ardāl and Safīābād; formerly known as Ardal (اردال), also romanized as Ardāl) is a village in Sohr and Firuzan Rural District of Pir Bakran District (Note: Formerly Garkan-e Shomali District) in Falavarjan County, Isfahan province, Iran.

== Demographics ==
=== Population ===
At the time of the 2006 National Census, the village's population, as Ardal, was 609 in 156 households. The following census in 2011 counted 728 people in 219 households, by which time the village was listed as Ardal and Safiabad. The 2016 census measured the population of the village as 691 people in 224 households.
