= Pelarat =

Village in Isfahan province, Iran

Pelarat Persian: پلارت
- Village
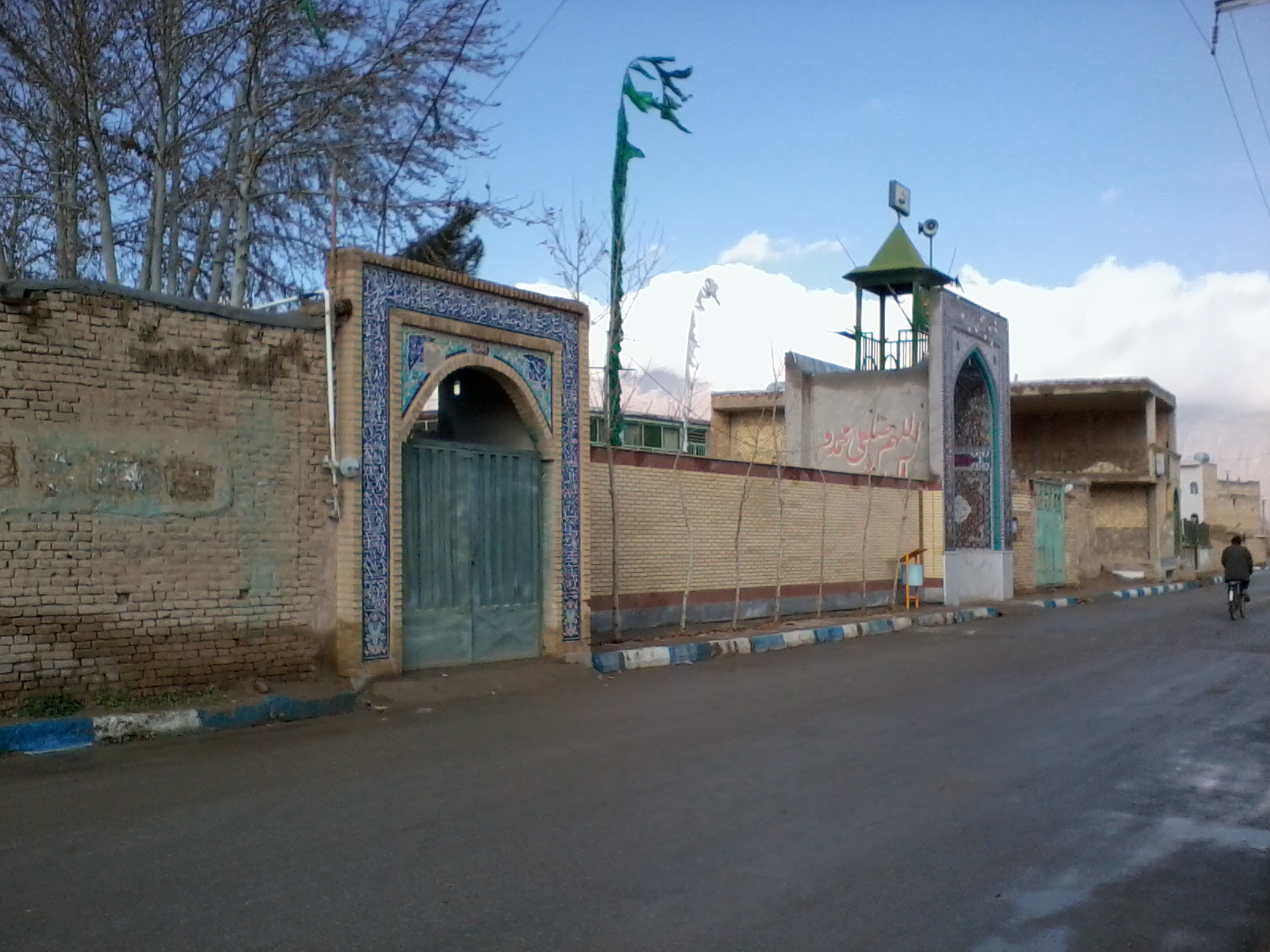
- The village of Pelarat

- Location within Iran
- Coordinates: 32°27′53″N 51°34′40″E
- Country: Iran
- Province: Isfahan
- County: Falavarjan
- District: Pir Bakran
- Rural District: Garkan-e Shomali

Population (2016)
  - Total: 1,310
- Time zone: UTC+3:30 (IRST)

Pelarat (Persian: پلارت) (Note: Also romanized as Pelārat and Pelārt) is a village in Garkan-e Shomali Rural District of Pir Bakran District (Note: Formerly Garkan-e Shomali District) in Falavarjan County, Isfahan province, Iran.

== Demographics ==
=== Population ===
At the time of the 2006 National Census, the village's population was 1,289 in 353 households. The following census in 2011 counted 1,312 people in 395 households. The 2016 census measured the population of the village as 1,310 people in 418 households.
