= Huyeh =

Huyeh or Huyah or Havyeh or Huyyeh (Persian: هويه) may refer to:

- Huyyeh, Isfahan
- Huyeh, Kurdistan
