= Jilab =

Village in Isfahan province, Iran

Jilab Persian: جيلاب
- Village
- Location within Iran
- Coordinates: 32°30′03″N 51°29′14″E
- Country: Iran
- Province: Isfahan
- County: Falavarjan
- District: Central
- Rural District: Ashtarjan

Population (2016)
  - Total: 392
- Time zone: UTC+3:30 (IRST)

Jilab (Persian: جيلاب) (Note: Also romanized as Jīlāb; also known as Ḩīlāb) is a village in Ashtarjan Rural District of the Central District in Falavarjan County, Isfahan province, Iran.

== Demographics ==
=== Population ===
At the time of the 2006 National Census, the village's population was 388 in 88 households. The following census in 2011 counted 379 people in 104 households. The 2016 census measured the population of the village as 392 people in 109 households.
