= Jameh Mosque of Ashtarjan =

Mosque in Falavarjan, Isfahan, Iran

Jāmeh Mosque of Ashtarjan
- مسجد جامع اشترجان
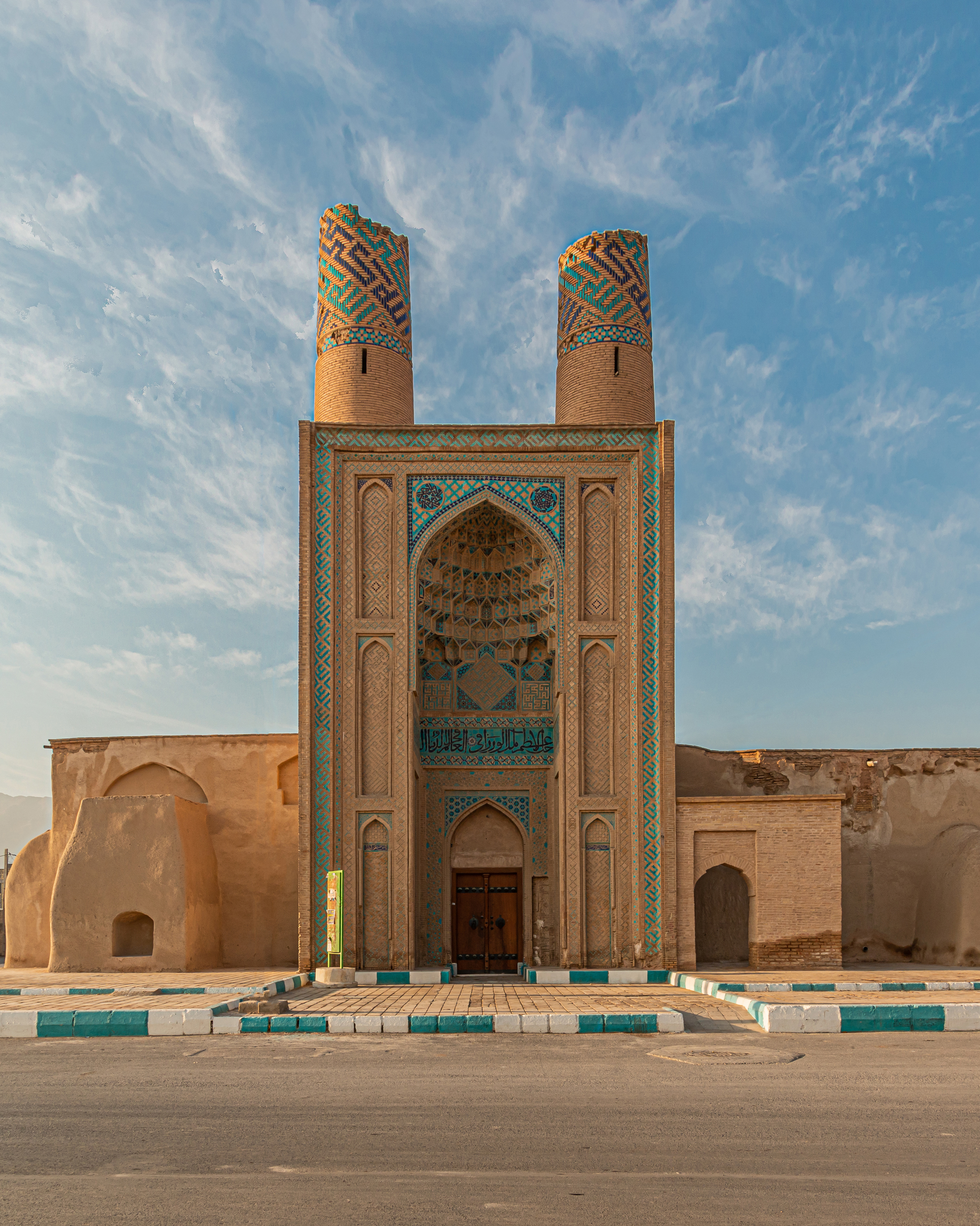
- Main Facade, showing the broken minarets

- Location of the mosque in Iran

Religion
- Affiliation: Shia Islam
- Ecclesiastical or organisational status: Friday mosque
- Status: Active

Location
- Location: Ashtarjan, Falavarjan County, Isfahan province
- Country: Iran
- Coordinates: 32°28′33″N 51°28′45″E

Architecture
- Type: Mosque architecture
- Style: Seljuk; Ilkhanid; Timurid
- Completed: 1316 CE (iwan, dome); 1476 CE (Shabestan); 1829 (sangab)

Specifications
- Interior area: 1,500 m^{2} (16,000 sq ft)
- Dome: One
- Minaret: Two
- Inscriptions: 47 (maybe more)
- Materials: Adobe; bricks; plaster; tiles

Iran National Heritage List
- Official name: Friday Mosque of Ashtarjan
- Type: Friday Mosque
- Designated: 1937
- Reference no.: 263
- Conservation organization: Cultural Heritage, Handicrafts and Tourism Organization of Iran

The Jāmeh Mosque of Ashtarjan (Persian: مسجد جامع اشترجان), also known as the Jameh Mosque of Imanshahr and the Jameh Mosque of Oshtorjan, is a Shi'ite Friday mosque (jāmeh), located in Ashtarjan, Falavarjan County, in the province of Isfahan, Iran, situated approximately 36 kilometres (22 mi) south-west of the city of Esfahan.

The mosque was added to the Iran National Heritage List on 3 March 1937, administered by the Cultural Heritage, Handicrafts and Tourism Organization of Iran.

== History ==
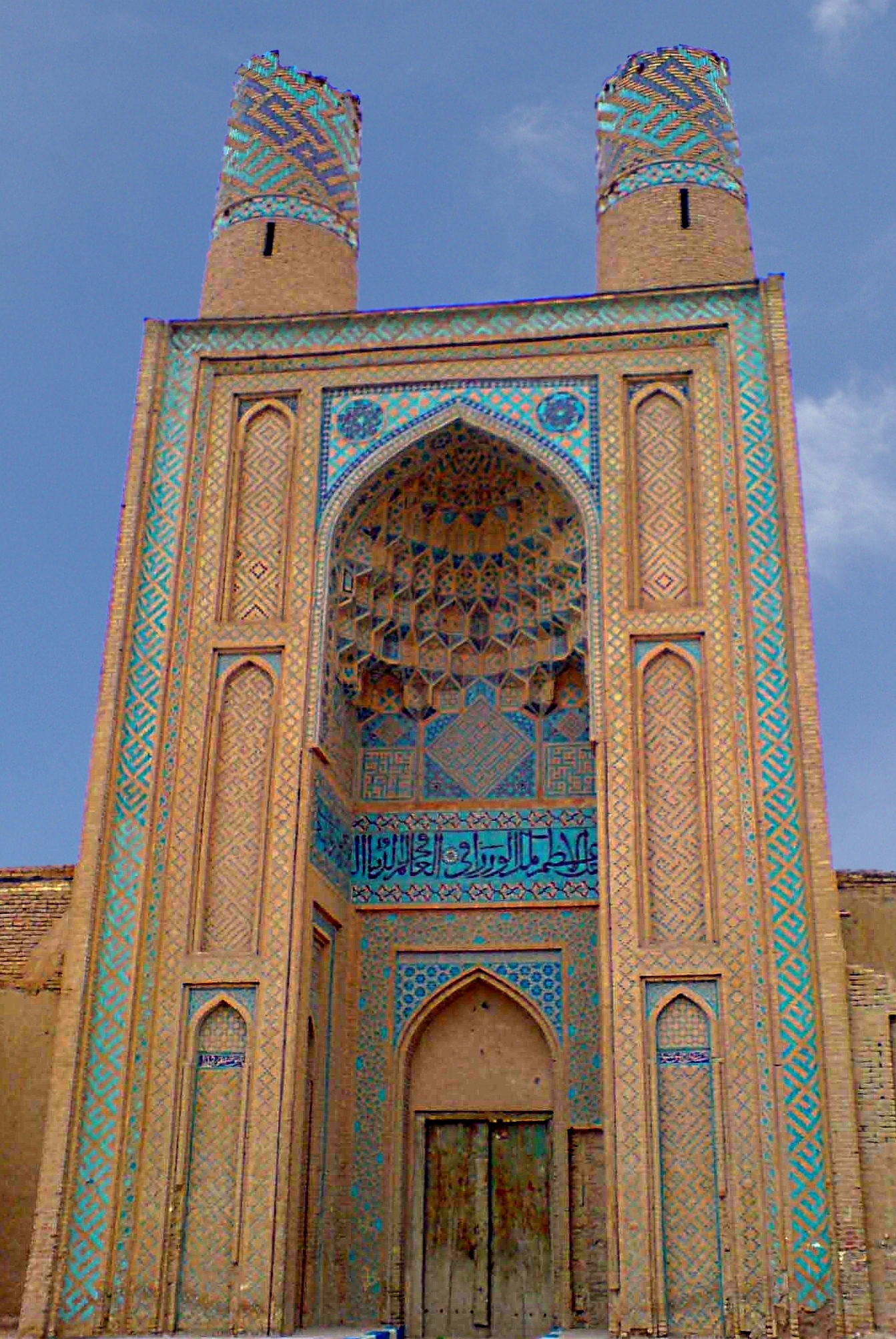
Iwan of the mosque in 2008

Commissioned by an Ilkhanid administrator from Ashtarjan and dated by two separate inscriptions to 1315–16, this mosque has survived in excellent condition. Construction appears to have been swift, executed in phases over a brief period. The calligraphy inside the mosque mentions Ahmad ebn Banna and Haji Mohammad Kashi Tarash as the builders in charge of construction of the mosque. One of the main reasons for this mosque's survival after more than seven centuries is the metal wires that are placed inside the walls of the mosque that hold it together.

=== Patronage and political context ===
The inscriptions reveal the complex political landscape of the Ilkhanid period. While the mosque was built under Oljeitu's officially Shi'ite rule (evidenced by the inclusion of the Twelve Imams' names), its construction was commissioned by Fakhr al-Dunya wa'l-Din Muhammad b. Mahmud b. 'Ali al-Ushturjani, identified as a mustawfi (state accountant) and munshi (secretary), rather than a high-ranking vizier. His inflated titles, like "King of the Viziers in the Universe," highlight the changing nature of political authority during this period.

== Architecture ==
=== Exterior ===
The north entrance of the mosque has a stalactite-vaulted recess framing the pointed arch portal. It has geometric decorations of light- and dark-blue tile mosaic combined with unglazed terracotta, and a foundation inscription in tile mosaic thuluth. There are also square Kufic panels made of terracotta and glazed tile. The two minarets flanking the portal are adorned with diagonal bands of banna’i script in glazed tiles. The east portal has a much simpler design than the north portal. It has stucco panels with an inscription with a floriated scroll ground.

=== Interior ===
The interior of the mosque has an open court surrounded by prayer halls on three sides. The walls are decorated with a combination of plain mud brick and decorative plaster, featuring incised patterns. The dome chamber has squinches that transition into a 16-sided drum. Rectangular windows punctuate the dome. There are some decorative elements, such as terracotta ribs and painted plaster, that enhance the visual appeal, as well as vibrant polychrome painting in white, red, blue, and green. The mihrab is flanked by pointed arch recesses with intricate plaster strapwork. The prayer halls, located on three sides of the court, have been recently repaired. Plaster is extensively used for false bonding patterns, floral motifs, and vivid polychrome painting, while terracotta and glazed tiles enhance the interior with strapwork, geometric patterns, and inscriptions. Inscription bands in naskh and Kufic scripts are often rendered in contrasting colors such as blue and white. The mosque's interior may reflect the skill of its artisans, including “Ahmad ibn Muhammad” (builder) and “Hajji Muhammad” (tile-cutter), highlighting a legacy of exceptional Iranian craftsmanship. Their names are on the north outside portal, although the tile cutter refers only to tilework, of which there is almost none inside.

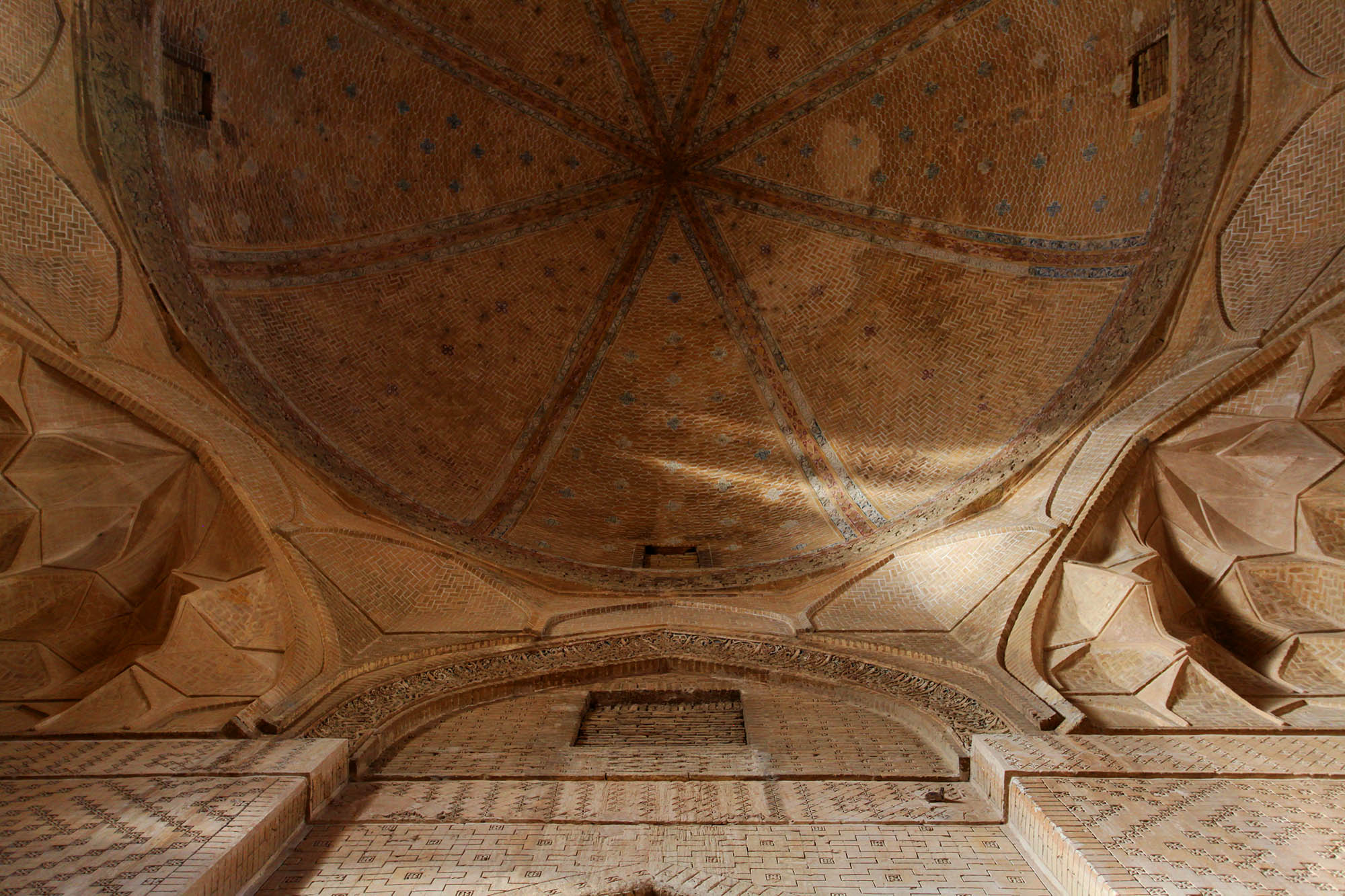
Interior dome, with Muqarnas in the Squinches

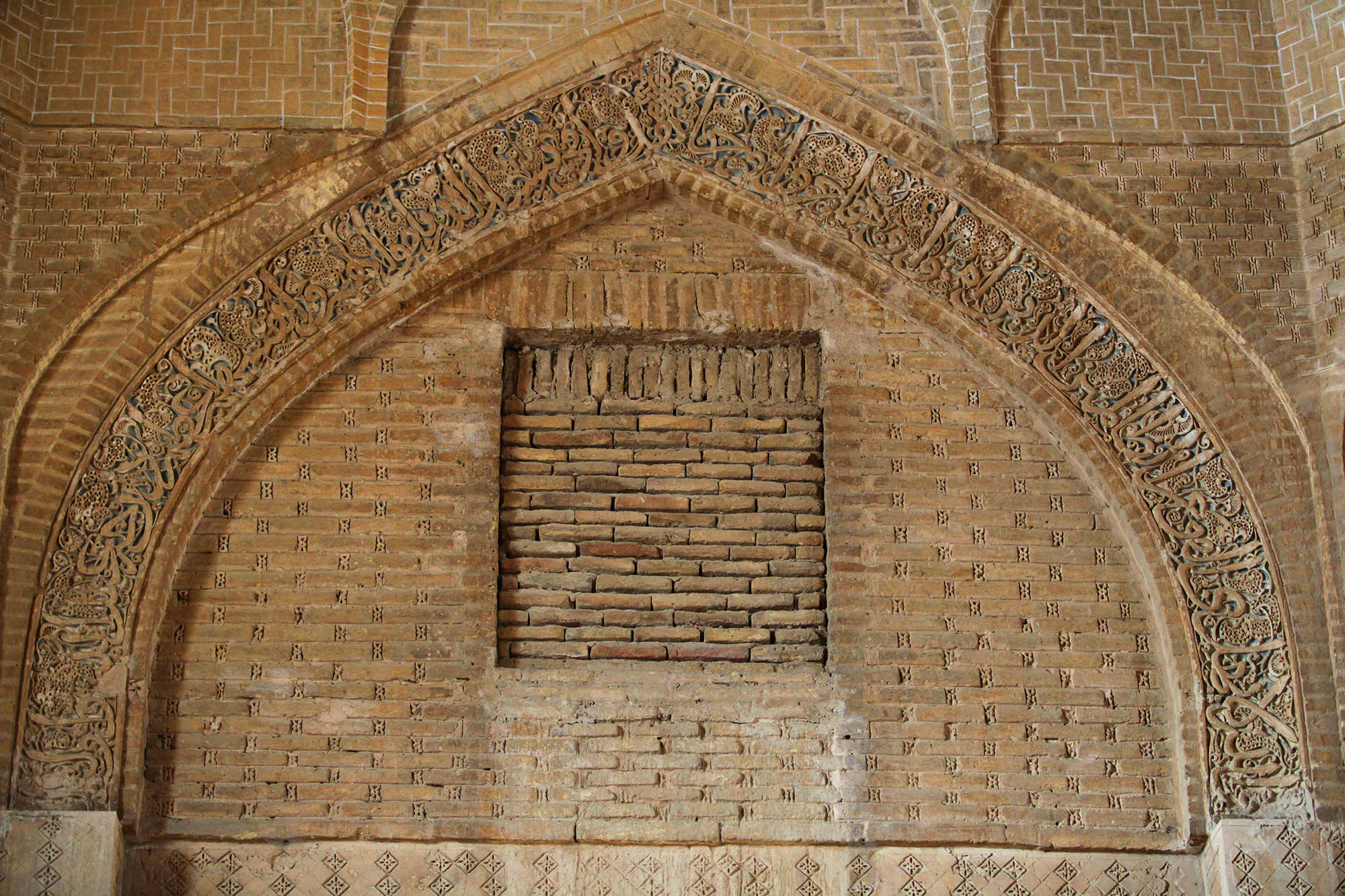
Inscription in the Arch below the dome

=== Specifications ===
The mosque has an area of 1,500 square metres (16,000 sq ft), and has two northern and southern gates. The northern gate is 13 meters tall and surrounded by remnants of two brick minarets that are decorated with turquoise tiles. Only one third of these minarets survive; they were constructed in such a way that swinging one minaret would cause the swinging of the other minaret. The southern gate of the mosque is 7 metres (23 ft) tall and decorated with colorful plasterwork.

The decoration is of greater importance than the primary structure. The diversity of patterns, materials, and combination of materials employed in the decoration represent a compendium of decorative techniques from around the country. Exposed brick is found only in the arcades, although possibly this area originally had a plaster coat as is employed extensively in the rest of the structure. The plaster is carved in a variety of decorative designs, including geometric patterns; floral motifs in high relief; simulated brick bond, and brick end-plugs – in some areas arranged to configure rectangular kufic inscriptions. On the sanctuary walls and dome, traces indicate that plaster was painted in a vivid array of colors. The lofty stucco mihrab describes an uncommon proportion, reaching the zone of transition. Across the interior of the dome, decorative terracotta elements form eight radial ribs; diverse painted plaster patterns fill the interstices. The northern entrance portal is lavishly decorated with mosaic faience, glazed and unglazed terracotta.

=== Minarets ===
The minarets have been reduced to one-third of their original height over time. Despite this, the surviving sections continue to frame a 13-metre-high (43 ft) doorway, exemplifying the architectural sophistication of the Ilkhanid style.

=== Inscriptions ===
The Ashtarjān mosque features an unexpectedly large number of inscriptions for its size and location. Miles identifies 47 distinct inscriptions or epigraphic compositions, including six building inscriptions that provide key details about the mosque's construction and its patron, twenty-seven Quranic passages chosen for their religious significance and decorative qualities, thirteen pious phrases, benedictions, or pious ejaculations that express common Islamic beliefs and invocations, and two visitors' inscriptions, one dating from 1333 and a later inscription from 1476 that documents a major renovation of the mosque. This abundance of inscriptions allows for a multifaceted understanding of the mosque and its history.

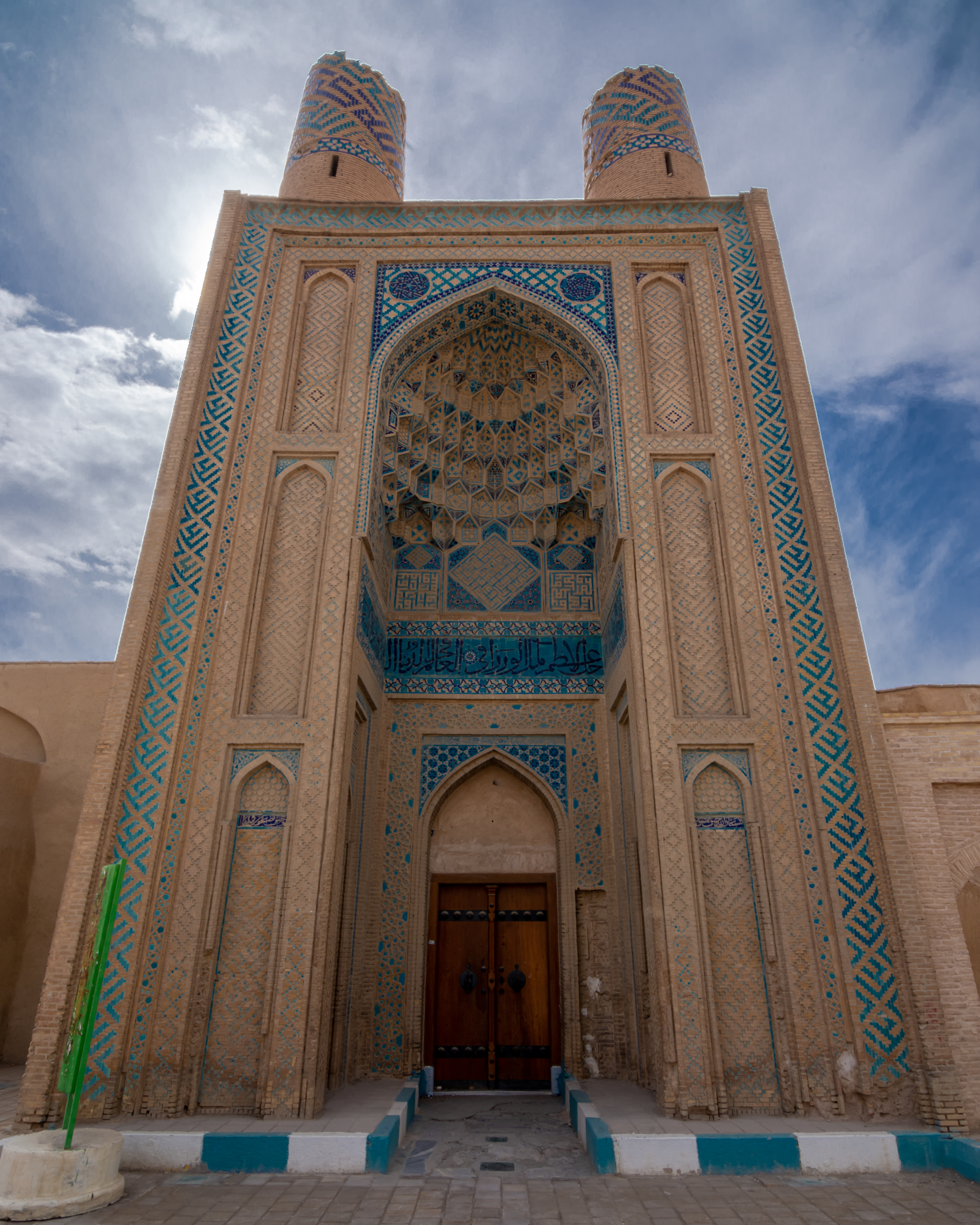
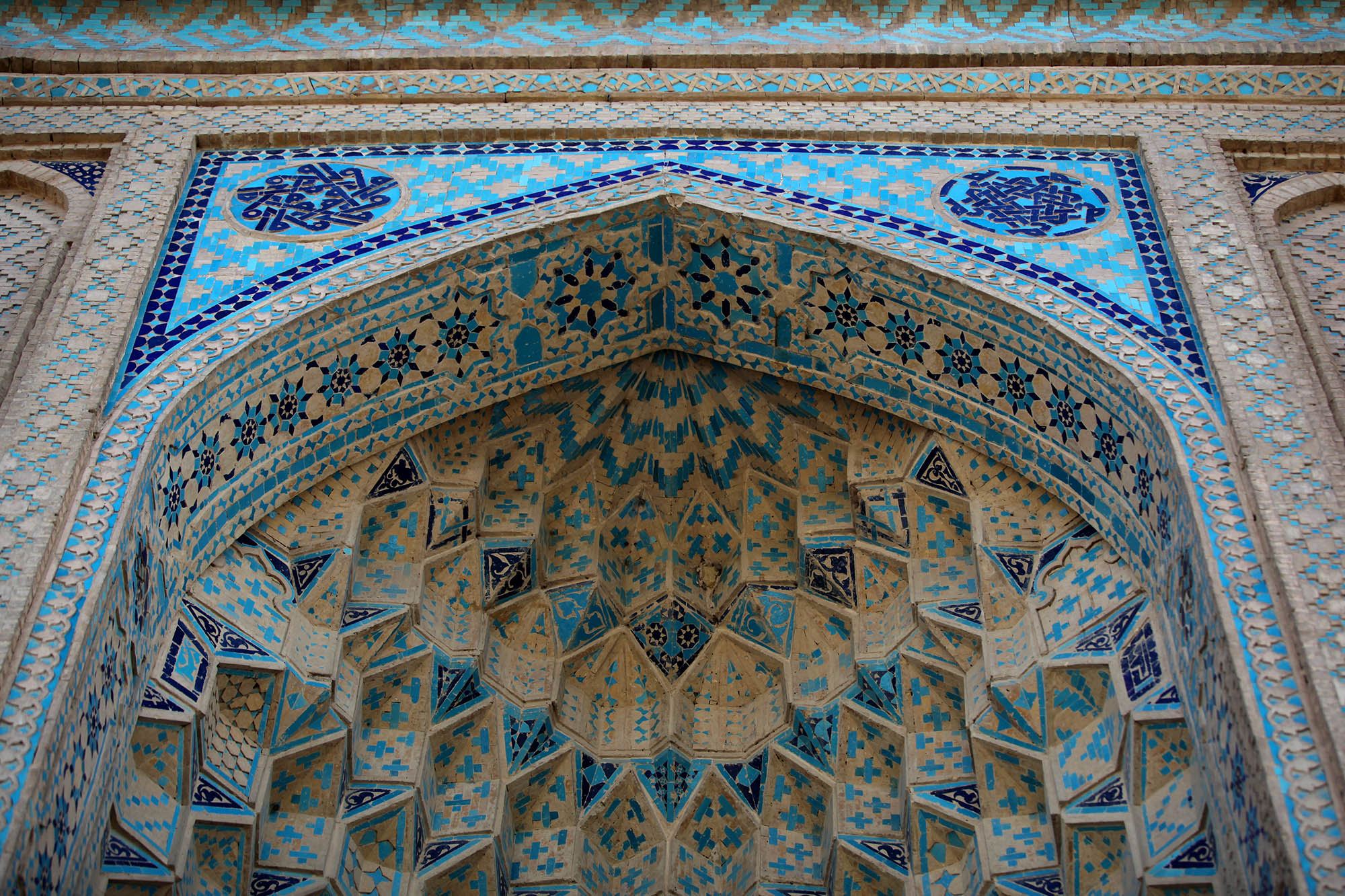
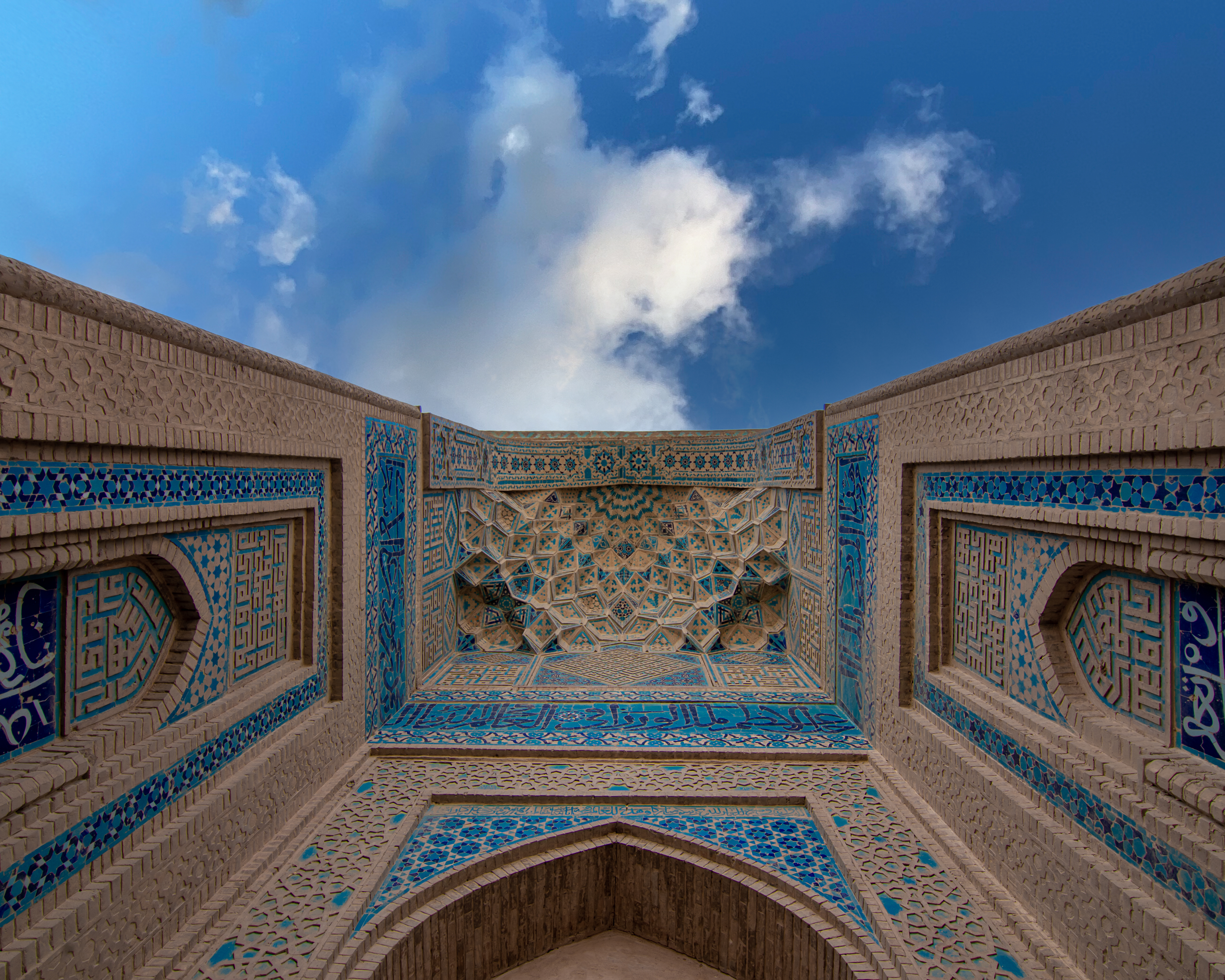
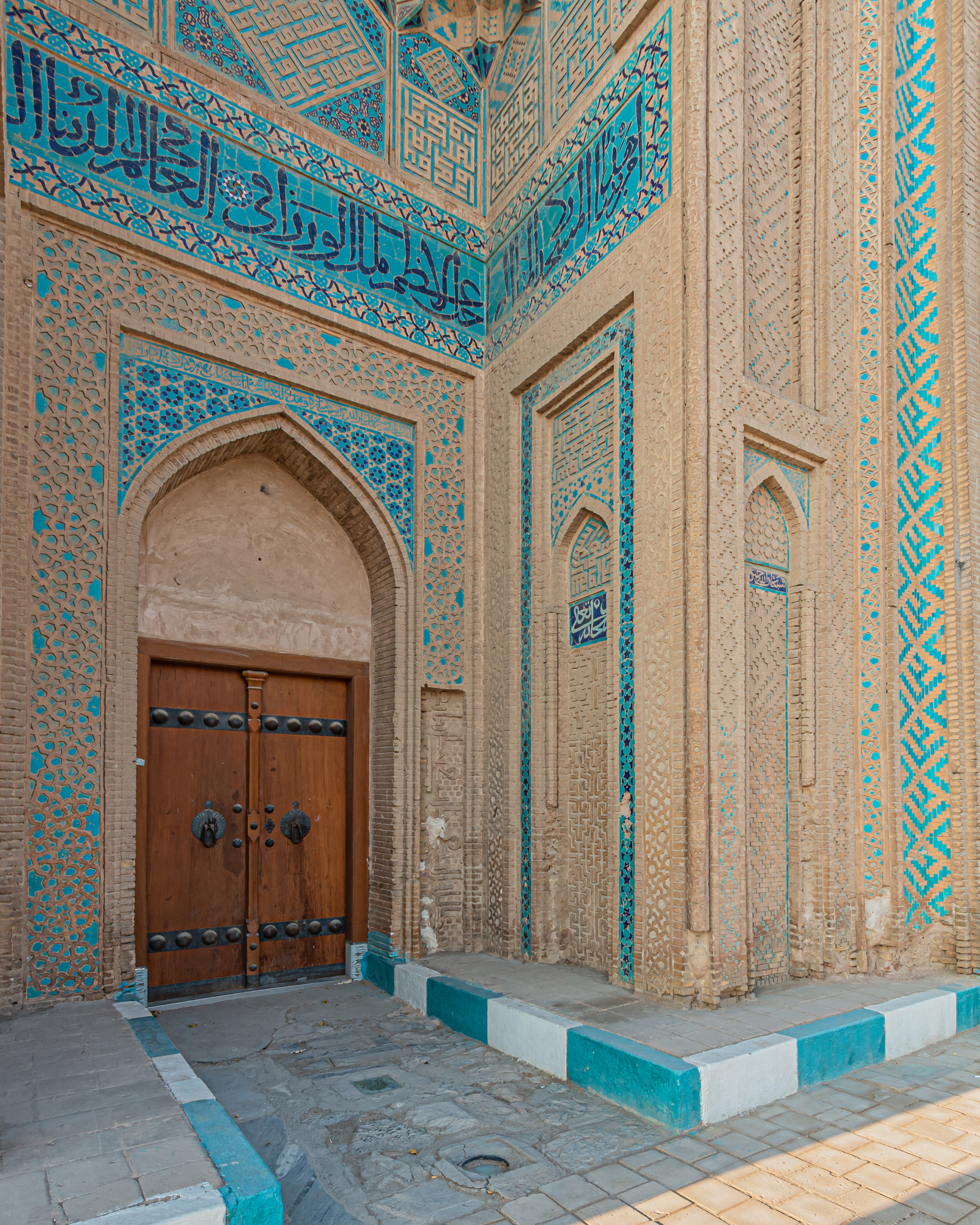
Views of the Main Iwan

One of the most important revelations from the inscriptions is the identity of the mosque's patron, Fakhr al-Dunya wa'l-Din Muhammad b. Mahmud b. 'Ali al-Ushturjani. He is identified as the individual who "commanded the building of this blessed mosque." While his titles, al-sahib al-a'zam and malik al-wuzara' fi'l-'alam ("the most great lord, king of viziers in the universe"), suggest a high-ranking official, Miles demonstrates that this was not the case in 715/1315, the year the mosque was built.

Through a comparative analysis of contemporary inscriptions, the title of vizier had become more common in the Ilkhanid period and was no longer reserved solely for the highest officials. The patron of the mosque, Muhammad b. Mahmud b. 'Ali al-Ushturjani, is identified as a mustawfi and munshi rather than a vizier. This discovery sheds light on the practice of employing inflated titles during this era, demonstrating how epigraphic evidence can challenge assumptions based solely on titles.

The inscriptions also offer valuable insights into the construction of the mosque. They record the names of the key craftsmen involved, including Mason Ahmad b. Muhammad, known as haddad (the smith or iron-worker), and Hjajji Muhammad, the tile-cutter from Tabriz. These names highlight the collaborative nature of mosque construction and emphasize the contributions of skilled artisans. While the building inscriptions offer foundational information, Miles demonstrates that a comprehensive analysis of all the inscriptions reveals a richer and more nuanced understanding of the mosque's history and purpose. For example, the repeated invocation of the names of Muhammad and the Twelve Imams in Kufic script highlights the Shi'ite character of the mosque and links its construction to the broader context of the Ilkhanid state's official adoption of Shi'ism under Oljeitu. The inscription recording the restoration of the mosque in 881/1476 under the patronage of Pir Kamal al-D[in] Isma'il, son of Zahir al-Din Ibrahim, offers a glimpse into the mosque's continued importance in later centuries. This inscription, commissioned during the reign of the Aq Qoyunlu ruler Uzun Hasan, also underscores the enduring practice of pious patronage for mosque upkeep and renovation.

== See also ==
- Shia Islam in Iran
- List of mosques in Iran
- List of historical structures in Isfahan province
