= Kavian =

Village in Isfahan province, Iran

Kavian Persian: كاويان
- Village
- Location within Iran
- Coordinates: 32°28′19″N 51°30′16″E
- Country: Iran
- Province: Isfahan
- County: Falavarjan
- District: Central
- Rural District: Ashtarjan

Population (2016)
  - Total: 1,550
- Time zone: UTC+3:30 (IRST)

Kavian (Persian: كاويان) (Note: Also romanized as Kāvīān; formerly known as Gāv Nān (گاونان); also known as Gābnān and Govnān) is a village in Ashtarjan Rural District of the Central District in Falavarjan County, Isfahan province, Iran.

== Demographics ==
=== Population ===
At the time of the 2006 National Census, the village's population was 1,795 in 495 households. The following census in 2011 counted 1,661 people in 511 households. The 2016 census measured the population of the village as 1,550 people in 526 households.
