= Dargan, Isfahan =

Village in Isfahan province, Iran

Dargan Persian: دارگان
- Village
- Location within Iran
- Coordinates: 32°26′08″N 51°33′32″E
- Country: Iran
- Province: Isfahan
- County: Falavarjan
- District: Pir Bakran
- Rural District: Garkan-e Shomali

Population (2016)
  - Total: 2,409
- Time zone: UTC+3:30 (IRST)

Dargan (Persian: دارگان) (Note: Also romanized as Dārgān; also known as Dārgūn and Dārjān) is a village in Garkan-e Shomali Rural District of Pir Bakran District (Note: Formerly Garkan-e Shomali District) in Falavarjan County, Isfahan province, Iran.

== Demographics ==
=== Population ===
At the time of the 2006 National Census, the village's population was 2,548 in 754 households. The following census in 2011 counted 2,510 people in 811 households. The 2016 census measured the population of the village as 2,409 people in 836 households, the most populous in its rural district.
