= Dar Afshan =

Dar Afshan or Darafshan (Persian: دارافشان) may refer to:

- Dar Afshan, Falavarjan
- Darafshan, Pir Bakran, Falavarjan County
