= Mehranjan-e Atrak =

Village in Isfahan province, Iran

Mehranjan-e Atrak Persian: مهرنجان اتراك
- Village
- Location within Iran
- Coordinates: 32°28′53″N 51°30′00″E
- Country: Iran
- Province: Isfahan
- County: Falavarjan
- District: Central
- Rural District: Ashtarjan

Population (2016)
  - Total: 1,272
- Time zone: UTC+3:30 (IRST)

Mehranjan-e Atrak (Persian: مهرنجان اتراك) (Note: Also romanized as Mehranjān-e Atrak, Mehrenjan-e Otrak, and Mehrenjān-e Otrak; also known as Mehranjān and Mīrājān) is a village in Ashtarjan Rural District of the Central District in Falavarjan County, Isfahan province, Iran.

== Demographics ==
=== Population ===
At the time of the 2006 National Census, the village's population was 1,640 in 400 households. The following census in 2011 counted 1,760 people in 477 households. The 2016 census measured the population of the village as 1,272 people in 355 households.
