= Minadasht =

City in Isfahan province, Iran

Minadasht Persian: مینادشت
- City
- Location within Iran
- Coordinates: 32°29′32″N 51°26′22″E
- Country: Iran
- Province: Isfahan
- County: Falavarjan
- District: Central
- Established as a city: 2020
- Time zone: UTC+3:30 (IRST)

Minadasht (Persian: مینادشت) is a city in the Central District of Falavarjan County, Isfahan province, Iran.

== History ==
In 2000, the villages of Ashtarjan and Minadasht in Ashtarjan Rural District were merged to form the new city of Imanshahr. In 2020, the city was divided into the new cities of Ashtarjan and Minadasht.
