= Dastana =

Dastana or Dastna (Persian: دستنا) may refer to:

- Dastana, Chaharmahal and Bakhtiari
- Dastna, Isfahan
