= Mehranjan, Falavarjan =

Village in Isfahan province, Iran

Mehranjan Persian: مهرنجان
- Village
- Location within Iran
- Country: Iran
- Province: Isfahan
- County: Falavarjan
- District: Central
- Rural District: Ashtarjan

Population (2016)
  - Total: 231
- Time zone: UTC+3:30 (IRST)

Mehranjan (Persian: مهرنجان) (Note: Also romanized as Mehranjān; formerly known as Mehranjan-e Arameneh (مهرنجان ارامنه), also romanized as Mehranjān-e Ārāmeneh; in Armenian: Մէհրնջան)) is a village in Ashtarjan Rural District of the Central District in Falavarjan County, Isfahan province, Iran.

== Demographics ==
=== Population ===
At the time of the 2006 National Census, the village's population was 269 in 70 households. The following census in 2011 counted 266 people in 76 households. The 2016 census measured the population of the village as 231 people in 77 households.
