= Nargan, Isfahan =

Village in Isfahan province, Iran

Nargan Persian: نرگان
- Village
- Location within Iran
- Coordinates: 32°28′07″N 51°31′00″E
- Country: Iran
- Province: Isfahan
- County: Falavarjan
- District: Pir Bakran
- Rural District: Sohr and Firuzan

Population (2016)
  - Total: 1,348
- Time zone: UTC+3:30 (IRST)

Nargan (Persian: نرگان) (Note: Also romanized as Nargān) is a village in Sohr and Firuzan Rural District of Pir Bakran District (Note: Formerly Garkan-e Shomali District) in Falavarjan County, Isfahan province, Iran.

== Demographics ==
=== Population ===
At the time of the 2006 National Census, the village's population was 1,366 in 348 households. The following census in 2011 counted 1,354 people in 388 households. The 2016 census measured the population of the village as 1,348 people in 419 households.
