= Yad (disambiguation) =

Yad may refer to:

== Hebrew usage ==
Yad (יד) means hand in Hebrew.

It can refer to a

- Yad, a pointer used for Torah reading in Jewish synagogues
- Yad Hachazakah, an alternate name for the Mishneh Torah, the code of Maimonides

Yad can also refer to a monument or memorial. In this usage, it forms a part of several place names:

- Yad Vashem, the Holocaust memorial museum in Jerusalem
- Yad Mordechai, a kibbutz near Ashkelon
- Yad Avshalom, an ancient tomb in Jerusalem
- Yad Kennedy, a memorial for John F. Kennedy in Jerusalem
- Yad La-Shiryon, a memorial for the Israeli armed forces near Latrun
- Yad Natan, a moshav near Kiryat Gat
- Yad Sarah, an Israeli volunteer organization

== Other uses ==
- Yad, Iran, a village in Isfahan Province
- Yad Lagla, an Indian song by Ajay-Atul
- Moose Lake Airport, Canada (by IATA code)
- Yagua language (by ISO 639 code)
