= Dastana, Isfahan =

Village in Isfahan province, Iran

Dastana Persian: دستنا
- Village
- Location within Iran
- Coordinates: 32°30′14″N 51°33′12″E
- Country: Iran
- Province: Isfahan
- County: Falavarjan
- District: Pir Bakran
- Rural District: Garkan-e Shomali

Population (2016)
  - Total: 387
- Time zone: UTC+3:30 (IRST)

Dastana (Persian: دستنا) (Note: Also romanized as Dastanā, Dastnā, and Dastnā’) is a village in Garkan-e Shomali Rural District of Pir Bakran District (Note: Formerly Garkan-e Shomali District) in Falavarjan County, Isfahan province, Iran.

== Demographics ==
=== Population ===
At the time of the 2006 National Census, the village's population was 377 in 97 households. The following census in 2011 counted 354 people in 101 households. The 2016 census measured the population of the village as 387 people in 118 households.
