= Falavarjan County Municipalities Mass Transit Organization =

Falavarjan County Municipalities Mass Transit Organization Falavarbus سازمان حمل و نقل جمعی شهرداریهای شهرستان فلاورجان
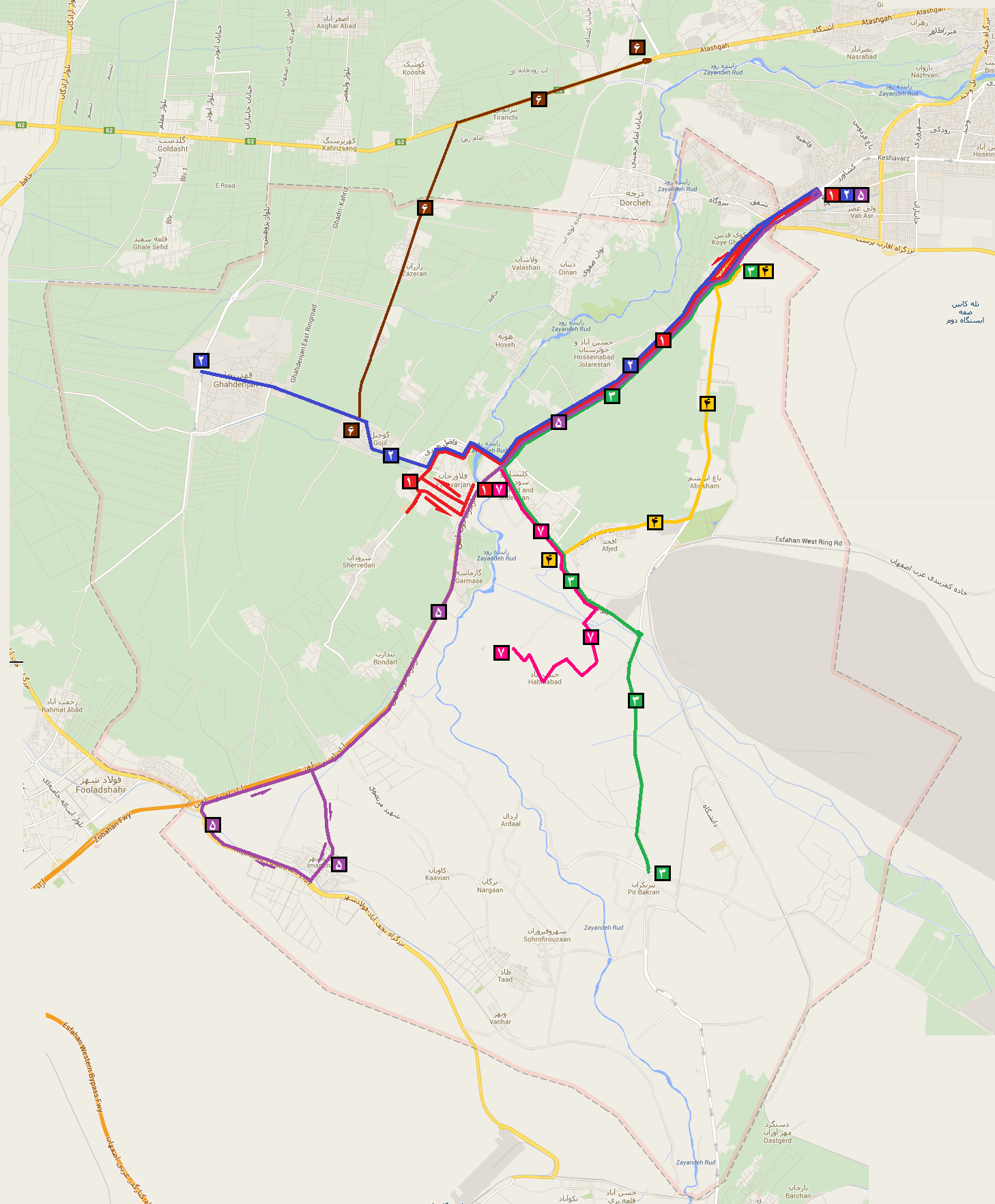
- Service area: Falavarjan County, Isfahan Province
- Service type: Bus service
- Routes: 7
- Stations: 92
- Fleet: 33 buses
- Operator: Falavarjan County Governorship
- Chief executive: Mr. Jafari
- Website: سازمان حمل و نقل جمعی شهرداریهای شهرستان فلاورجان

Falavarjan County Municipalities Mass Transit Organization (Persian: سازمان حمل و نقل جمعی شهرداریهای شهرستان فلاورجان) also written in English as Falavarbus is a public transport agency running Transit buses in Falavarjan County, located in southeastern Isfahan city, in Greater Isfahan Region, Central Iran. The organization serves the cities of Falavarjan, Pir Bakran, Baharan Shahr, Kelishad va Sudarjan, Qahderijan, Abrisham, Zazeran, and Imanshahr, with a few termini located in Isfahan city's Municipal District 13 and Khomeynishahr.

== Smart Card ==
Announced on 14 February 2013, 900 million Rials (Around 285'000 US Dollars at the time) has been allocated for the installation of electronic ticket card systems on buses. It has been announced that negotiations with Isfahan's Bus Company is underway to utilize the ESCard system to create unity in payment method used in both transit agencies.

== Routes ==
| Route | Name | Length (km) | Number of Buses | Number of Stations | Travel time | Connections |
|---|---|---|---|---|---|---|
| 1 | Falavarjan-Isfahan | 15 | 8 | 21 | 33 | Isfahan Bus BRT-1, 33, 39, 46, 66, 104 |
| 2 | Qahderijan-Isfahan | 20 | 7 | 30 | 37 | Isfahan Bus BRT-1, 33, 39, 46, 66, 104 |
| 3 | Pir Bakran-Isfahan | 20 | 7 | 17 | 40 | Isfahan Bus BRT-1, 104 |
| 4 | Abrisham-Isfahan | 13 | 7 | 17 | 32 | Isfahan Bus BRT-1, 104; Isfahan Bus 104 runs parallel to this route |
| 5 | Imanshahr-Isfahan | 28 | 2 | 14 | 40 | Isfahan Bus BRT-1, 33, 39, 46, 66, 104 |
| 6 | Zazeran-Khomeynishahr | 16 | 1 | 16 | 25 | Isfahan Bus 26, 75; Khomeynishahr Bus |
| 7 | Kelishad 3-way-Baharan Shahr | 8 | | | | |
