= Abrisham Rural District =

Rural district in Isfahan province, Iran

Abrisham Rural District Persian: دهستان ابريشم
- Rural District
- Location within Iran
- Coordinates: 32°34′N 51°32′E
- Country: Iran
- Province: Isfahan
- County: Falavarjan
- District: Central
- Established: 1987
- Capital: Abrisham

Population (2016)
  - Total: 25,512
- Time zone: UTC+3:30 (IRST)

Abrisham Rural District (Persian: دهستان ابريشم) is in the Central District of Falavarjan County, Isfahan province, Iran. It is administered from the city of Abrisham. (Note: Merger of the villages of Bagh-e Abrisham, Hasanabad, and Yazdabad)

== Demographics ==
=== Population ===
At the time of the 2006 National Census, the rural district's population was 9,414 in 2,443 households. There were 10,784 inhabitants in 3,144 households at the following census of 2011. The 2016 census measured the population of the rural district as 25,512 in 7,643 households. The most populous of its 15 villages was Jujil, with 6,372 people.

=== Other villages in the rural district ===
- Dashtchi
- Hoseynabad
- Huyyeh
- Jowlarestan
- Kafoshan
- Kersegan
- Musiyan
- Riyakhun
