= Pir Bakran mausoleum =

Mausoleum in Pir Bakran, Iranian national heritage site

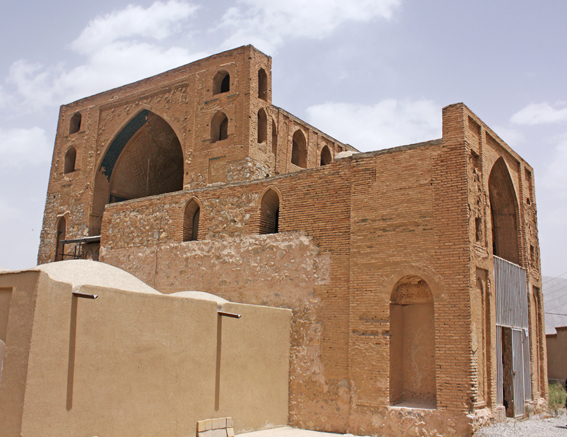

- Location within Iran

Religion
- District: Pir Bakran District
- Province: Isfahan Province

Location
- Location: Pir Bakran, Iran
- Municipality: Pir Bakran
- Coordinates: 32.468889°N 51.557776°E

Architecture
- Type: Mausoleum
- Style: Azeri
- Minaret: 0
- Iran National Heritage List
- Official name: Pir Bakran Mausoleum
- Type: Mausoleum
- Designated: 1932
- Reference no.: 101
- Conservation organization: Cultural Heritage, Handicrafts and Tourism Organization of Iran

The Pir Bakran mausoleum (Persian: آرامگاه پیربکران) is a historical mausoleum in Pir Bakran, the capital of Pir Bakran District. The mausoleum dates back to the Ilkhanid era. The names of The Rashidun Caliphs on its inscriptions show that the building belongs the early times of the conversion of mongols to islam and they were still sunnite. The courtyard of the mausoleum is surrounded by walls, small iwans and the arched portals of the main iwan and decorated by some inscriptions with Kufic scripts and stuccoes with the form of flowers and bushes, which are the works of Mohammad Naghash. Mohammad ebn-e Bakran's (fa) grave is located behind the courtyard. On the northern side of it, there's a small closed room, which was probably his teaching place. The mausoleum is decorated with stuccoes and tiles.
