= Zazeran =

City in Isfahan province, Iran

Zazeran Persian: زازران
- City
- Location within Iran
- Coordinates: 32°36′07″N 51°29′51″E
- Country: Iran
- Province: Isfahan
- County: Falavarjan
- District: Qahderijan
- Established as a city: 2012

Population (2016)
  - Total: 7,962
- Time zone: UTC+3:30 (IRST)

Zazeran (Persian: زازران) (Note: Also romanized as Zāzerān; Armenian: Զազրուն) is a city in Qahderijan District of Falavarjan County, Isfahan province, Iran, serving as the administrative center for Zazeran Rural District.

== Demographics ==
=== Population ===
At the time of the 2006 National Census, Zazeran's population was 7,670 in 2,003 households, when it was a village in Zazeran Rural District of the Central District. The following census in 2011 counted 8,151 people in 2,335 households. The 2016 census measured the population as 7,962 people in 2,452 households, by which time the rural district had been separated from the district in the formation of Qahderijan District. At the same time, the village of Zazeran was converted to a city.

== Transportation ==
For its public transit system, the city is served by Falavarjan County Municipalities Mass Transit Organization bus network Route 6.
