= Kelishad and Sudarjan =

City in Isfahan province, Iran

Kelishad and Sudarjan Persian: كليشاد و سودرجان
- City
- Location within Iran
- Coordinates: 32°32′56″N 51°31′43″E
- Country: Iran
- Province: Isfahan
- County: Falavarjan
- District: Central

Population (2016)
  - Total: 25,635
- Time zone: UTC+3:30 (IRST)

Kelishad and Sudarjan (Persian: كليشاد و سودرجان) (Note: The city is an amalgam of two earlier settlements: Kelishad (کلیشاد), also romanized as Kelīshād; also known as Bābā ‘Abdollāh, Gulshād, Kalūshād, Kelishad va Sudarjan, Kelīshād-e Soflá, and Kelīshād-e Vasūderjān, and Sudarjan (سودرجان), also romanized as Sūdarjān; also known as Sūdjān) is a city in the Central District of Falavarjan County, Isfahan province, Iran.

== Demographics ==
=== Population ===
At the time of the 2006 National Census, the city's population was 23,203 in 6,371 households. The following census in 2011 counted 24,355 people in 8,189 households. The 2016 census measured the population of the city as 25,635 people in 8,189 households.

== Transportation ==
For its public transit system, the city is served by Falavarjan County Municipalities Mass Transit Organization bus network Route 3.

== See also ==
Media related to Kelishad va Sudarjan at Wikimedia Commons
