= Sohr and Firuzan Rural District =

Rural district in Isfahan province, Iran

Sohr and Firuzan Rural District Persian: دهستان سهر و فيروزان
- Rural District
- Location within Iran
- Coordinates: 32°28′N 51°32′E
- Country: Iran
- Province: Isfahan
- County: Falavarjan
- District: Pir Bakran
- Established: 1991
- Capital: Sohr and Firuzan

Population (2016)
  - Total: 12,706
- Time zone: UTC+3:30 (IRST)

Sohr and Firuzan Rural District (Persian: دهستان سهر و فيروزان) is in Pir Bakran District (Note: Formerly Garkan-e Shomali District) of Falavarjan County, Isfahan province, Iran. Its capital is the village of Sohr and Firuzan.

== Demographics ==
=== Population ===
At the time of the 2006 National Census, the rural district's population was 13,191 in 3,550 households. There were 13,601 inhabitants in 4,111 households at the following census of 2011. The 2016 census measured the population of the rural district as 12,706 in 4,100 households. The most populous of its 14 villages was Tad (now a city), with 3,740 people.

=== Other villages in the rural district ===
- Ardal and Safiabad
- Bejgerd
- Cham Rud
- Filergan
- Golgun
- Nargan
- Shah Shams ol Din
- Venhar
