= Ashtarjan, Iran =

City in Isfahan province, Iran

Ashtarjan Persian: اشترجان
- City
- Location within Iran
- Coordinates: 32°28′25″N 51°28′37″E
- Country: Iran
- Province: Isfahan
- County: Falavarjan
- District: Central
- Established as a city: 2020
- Time zone: UTC+3:30 (IRST)

Ashtarjan (Persian: اشترجان) is a city in the Central District of Falavarjan County, Isfahan province, Iran, serving as the administrative center for Ashtarjan Rural District.

== History ==
In 2000, the villages of Ashtarjan and Minadasht in Ashtarjan Rural District were merged to form the new city of Imanshahr. In 2020, the city was divided into the new cities of Ashtarjan and Minadasht.
