= Pir Bakran =

City in Isfahan province, Iran

Pir Bakran Persian: پیربکران
- City
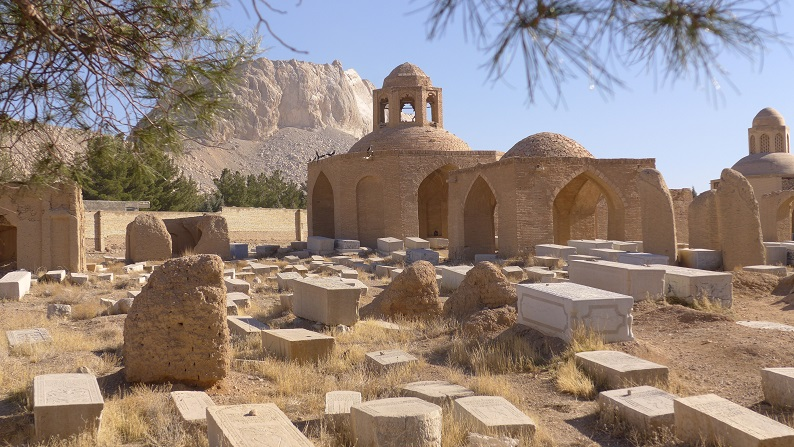
- Serah Bat Asher Cemetery in Pir Bakran

- Location within Iran
- Coordinates: 32°28′04″N 51°33′20″E
- Country: Iran
- Province: Isfahan
- County: Falavarjan
- District: Pir Bakran

Population (2016)
  - Total: 13,469
- Time zone: UTC+3:30 (IRST)

Pir Bakran (Persian: پیربکران) (Note: Also romanized as Pīr Bakrān; also known as Pīr Bāqerān; formerly Linjan (لنجان)) is a city in, and the capital of, Pir Bakran District (Note: Formerly Garkan-e Shomali District) in Falavarjan County, Isfahan province, Iran. It also serves as the administrative center for Garkan-e Shomali Rural District. The city is southwest by road from Isfahan.

== History ==
The villages of Fartkhun (فرتخون), Pava (پاوا), and Pir Bakran were merged to become the new village of Pir Bakran in 1991.

== Demographics ==
=== Population ===
At the time of the 2006 National Census, the city's population was 10,851 in 2,934 households. The following census in 2011 counted 12,192 people in 3,665 households. The 2016 census measured the population of the city as 13,469 people in 4,209 households.

== Attractions ==
Pir Bakran is named after Muhammad ibn Bakran, a wali who died in 1303 and whose dargah was built by the Ilkhanate and completed in 1312. The iwan was initially constructed to serve as his classroom, but was incomplete when he died. The structure was later modified to function as his mausoleum.

The ancient Jewish cemetery of Esfahan is situated close to this complex. It contains tombs inscribed from the 2nd century. The major mausoleum contains the tomb attributed to the biblical person Serah bat Asher. For Jews, this is a place of pilgrimage.

=== Transportation ===
For its public transit system, the city is served by Falavarjan County Municipalities Mass Transit Organization bus network route 3.

== Gallery ==
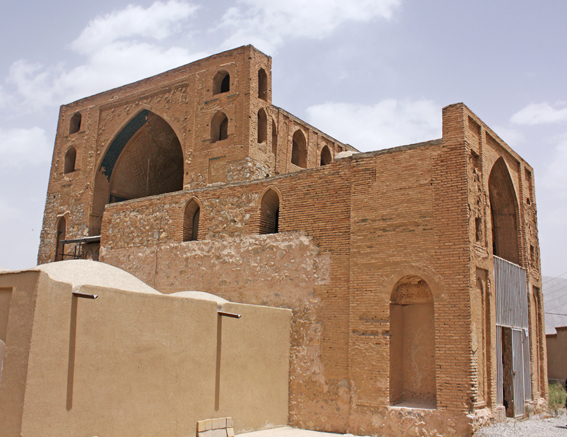

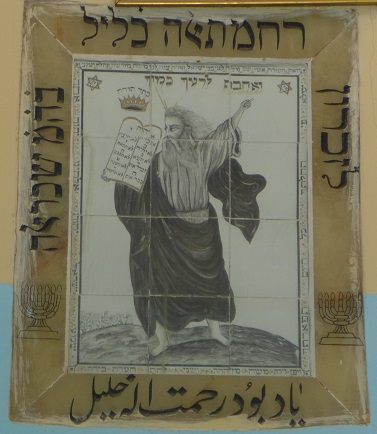
Memorial tile image for Moses, inscription in Hebrew and Farsi letters

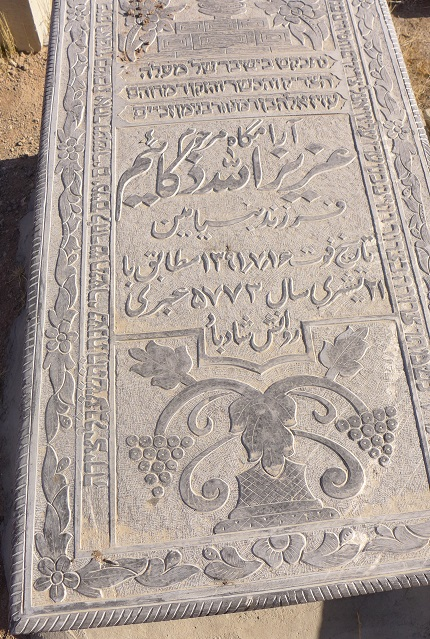
Recent gravestone (2012), showing date in Hebrew and Farsi calendars

== See also ==
- Pir Bakran mausoleum
