= Baharan Shahr =

City in Isfahan province, Iran

Baharan Shahr Persian: بهاران شهر
- City
- Location within Iran
- Coordinates: 32°30′57″N 51°32′23″E
- Country: Iran
- Province: Isfahan
- County: Falavarjan
- District: Pir Bakran
- Established as a city: 2000

Population (2016)
  - Total: 11,284
- Time zone: UTC+3:30 (IRST)

Baharan Shahr (Persian: بهاران شهر) (Note: Also romanized as Bahārān Shahr; also known as Bahārān and Pārān) is a city in Pir Bakran District (Note: Formerly Garkan-e Shomali District) of Falavarjan County, Isfahan province, Iran.

== History ==
The villages of Abneyl (آبنیل), Ajgerd (آجگرد), Bagh-e Kumeh (باغکومه), Habibabad (حبیب آباد), and Sahlavan (سهلوان) were merged to form the new city of Baharan Shahr in 2000.

== Demographics ==
=== Population ===
At the time of the 2006 National Census, the city's population was 10,325 in 2,911 households. The following census in 2011 counted 11,132 people in 3,401 households. The 2016 census measured the population of the city as 11,284 people in 3,647 households.

== Transportation ==
For its public transit system, the city is served by Falavarjan County Municipalities Mass Transit Organization bus network Route 7.
