= Imanshahr =

Former city in Isfahan province, Iran

Imanshahr Persian: ايمانشهر
- Former City
- Location within Iran
- Coordinates: 32°28′45″N 51°27′17″E
- Country: Iran
- Province: Isfahan
- County: Falavarjan
- District: Central
- Established: 2000

Population (2016)
  - Total: 14,633
- Time zone: UTC+3:30 (IRST)

Imanshahr (Persian: ايمانشهر) (Note: Formerly, Oshtorjan (اشترجان), also romanized as Oshtorjān) was a city in the Central District of Falavarjan County, Isfahan province, Iran. The villages of Ashtarjan and Minadasht in Ashtarjan Rural District had merged in 2000 to form the new city of Imanshahr.

== Demographics ==
=== Population ===
At the time of the 2006 National Census, the city's population was 13,535 in 3,468 households. The following census in 2011 counted 14,267 people in 4,227 households. The 2016 census measured the population of the city as 14,633 people in 4,515 households.

In 2020, Imanshahr was divided into the two new cities of Ashtarjan and Minadasht.
