= Qahderijan =

City in Isfahan province, Iran

Qahderijan Persian: قهدريجان
- City
- Location within Iran
- Coordinates: 32°34′38″N 51°27′14″E
- Country: Iran
- Province: Isfahan
- County: Falavarjan
- District: Qahderijan

Population (2016)
  - Total: 34,226
- Time zone: UTC+3:30 (IRST)
- Website: www.ghahderijan.com

Qahderijan (Persian: قهدريجان) (Note: Also romanized as Qahderījān; also known as Kedargūn, Qadrijān, and Qadrjā) is a city in, and the capital of, Qahderijan District in Falavarjan County, Isfahan province, Iran.

== Demographics ==
=== Population ===
At the time of the 2006 National Census, the city's population was 30,002 in 7,725 households, when it was in the Central District. The following census in 2011 counted 31,679 people in 9,261 households. The 2016 census measured the population of the city as 34,226 people in 10,490 households,

== Transportation ==
For its public transit system, the city is served by Falavarjan County Municipalities Mass Transit Organization bus network Route 2.
