= Abrisham =

City in Isfahan province, Iran

Abrisham Persian: ابریشم
- City
- Location within Iran
- Coordinates: 32°34′03″N 51°34′24″E
- Country: Iran
- Province: Isfahan
- County: Falavarjan
- District: Central
- Established: 1996

Population (2016)
  - Total: 22,429
- Time zone: UTC+3:30 (IRST)

Abrisham (Persian: ابریشم) (Note: Also romanized as Abrīsham; also known as Bāgh Abrīsham and Bāgh-e Abrīsham) is a city in the Central District of Falavarjan County, Isfahan province, Iran, serving as the administrative center for Abrisham Rural District.

== History ==
In 1996, the villages of Bagh-e Abrisham (باغ ابریشم), Hasanabad (حسن‌آباد), and Yazdabad (یزدآباد) in Abrisham Rural District were merged to form the new city of Abrisham.

== Demographics ==
=== Population ===
At the time of the 2006 National Census, the city's population was 19,406 in 5,324 households. The following census in 2011 counted 21,794 people in 6,381 households. The 2016 census measured the population of the city as 22,429 people in 7,063 households.
