= Bostan Zar =

City in Isfahan province, Iran

Bostan Zar Persian: بوستان زر
- City
- Location within Iran
- Coordinates: 32°29′36″N 51°30′45″E
- Country: Iran
- Province: Isfahan
- County: Falavarjan
- District: Central
- Established as a city: 2021

Population (2016)
  - Total: 5,309
- Time zone: UTC+3:30 (IRST)

Bostan Zar (Persian: بوستان زر) (Note: Formerly the village of Bostan (بوستان)) is a city in the Central District of Falavarjan County, Isfahan province, Iran.

== History ==
In 2008, the villages of Dorcheh Abed, Hajjiabad, Largan, and Largichi merged to form the village of Bostan.

== Demographics ==
=== Population ===
At the time of the 2011 census, Bostan's population was 4,962 in 1,521 households. The 2016 census measured the population as 5,309 people in 1,678 households, the most populous in its rural district. Bostan was converted to a city and renamed Bostan Zar in 2021.
