= Falavarjan =

City in Isfahan province, Iran

Falavarjan Persian: فلاورجان
- City
- Location within Iran
- Coordinates: 32°33′21″N 51°30′38″E
- Country: Iran
- Province: Isfahan
- County: Falavarjan
- District: Central

Population (2016)
  - Total: 37,704
- Time zone: UTC+3:30 (IRST)

Falavarjan (Persian: فلاورجان) (Note: Also romanized as Falāvar Jān, Falāvarjān, and Felāvarjān; also known as Mollāvarjān, Pol-e Vargān, Pol-e Varqān, and Pul-i-Vargān) is a city in the Central District of Falavarjan County, Isfahan province, Iran, serving as capital of both the county and the district.

== Etymology ==
The ancient name of this city was Barze, which means the branch of a tree or cultivation. This name gradually changed to Varjan. During the Safavid period, and due to the construction of a bridge on the Zayandeh Rood river, Varjan was renamed Polavarjan and thence to Falavarjan.

== Demographics ==
=== Population ===
At the time of the 2006 National Census, the city's population was 37,740 in 9,097 households. The following census in 2011 counted 38,310 people in 10,285 households. The 2016 census measured the population of the city as 37,704 people in 10,928 households.

== Transportation ==
The city is a part of Esfahan metropolitan area. For its public transit system, the city is served by Falavarjan County Municipalities Mass Transit Organization bus network.

== Cultural centers ==
Islamic Azad University of Falavarjan, founded in 1984.

== Notable people ==
- Majid Nasira'i, Shia Cleric
- Seyed Naser Mousavi Largani, Shia Cleric
