= Garkan-e Shomali Rural District =

Rural district in Isfahan province, Iran

Garkan-e Shomali Rural District Persian: دهستان گركن شمالي
- Rural District
- Location within Iran
- Coordinates: 32°29′N 51°36′E
- Country: Iran
- Province: Isfahan
- County: Falavarjan
- District: Pir Bakran
- Established: 1987
- Capital: Pir Bakran

Population (2016)
  - Total: 15,115
- Time zone: UTC+3:30 (IRST)

Garkan-e Shomali Rural District (Persian: دهستان گركن شمالي) is in Pir Bakran District (Note: Formerly Garkan-e Shomali District) of Falavarjan County, Isfahan province, Iran. It is administered from the city of Pir Bakran.

== Demographics ==
=== Population ===
At the time of the 2006 National Census, the rural district's population was 16,050 in 4,292 households. There were 16,500 inhabitants in 4,838 households at the following census of 2011. The 2016 census measured the population of the rural district as 15,115 in 4,839 households. The most populous of its 34 villages was Dargan, with 2,409 people.

=== Other villages in the rural district ===
- Ali Shahedan
- Dastana
- Khvansarak
- Mehregan
- Pelarat
- Rara
- Siah Afshar
