= Tad, Isfahan =

City in Isfahan province, Iran

Tad Persian: طاد
- City
- Location within Iran
- Coordinates: 32°27′01″N 51°31′28″E
- Country: Iran
- Province: Isfahan
- County: Falavarjan
- District: Pir Bakran

Population (2016)
  - Total: 3,740
- Time zone: UTC+3:30 (IRST)

Tad (Persian: طاد) (Note: Also romanized as Taad, Ţād, and Tād; also known as Yād) is a city in Pir Bakran District (Note: Formerly Garkan-e Shomali District) of Falavarjan County, Isfahan province, Iran.

== Demographics ==
=== Population ===
At the time of the 2006 National Census, the Tad's population was 3,671 in 993 households, when it was a village in Sohr and Firuzan Rural District. The following census in 2011 counted 3,777 people in 1,150 households. The 2016 census measured the population of the village as 3,740 people in 1,171 households, the most populous in its rural district.

The village of Tad was converted to a city in 2021.
