= Nargan, Sistan and Baluchestan =

Nargan نرگان
- Village
- Location within Iran
- Coordinates: 27°48′47″N 60°57′30″E
- Country: Iran
- Province: Sistan and Baluchestan
- County: Khash
- Bakhsh: Irandegan
- Rural District: Kahnuk

Population (2006)
  - Total: 130
- Time zone: UTC+3:30 (IRST)
  - Summer (DST): UTC+4:30 (IRDT)

Nargan (Persian: نرگان, also Romanized as Nargān) is a village in Kahnuk Rural District, Irandegan District, Khash County, Sistan and Baluchestan Province, Iran. At the 2006 census, its population was 130, in 27 families.
