= Huyeh, Kurdistan =

Huyeh هويه
- Village
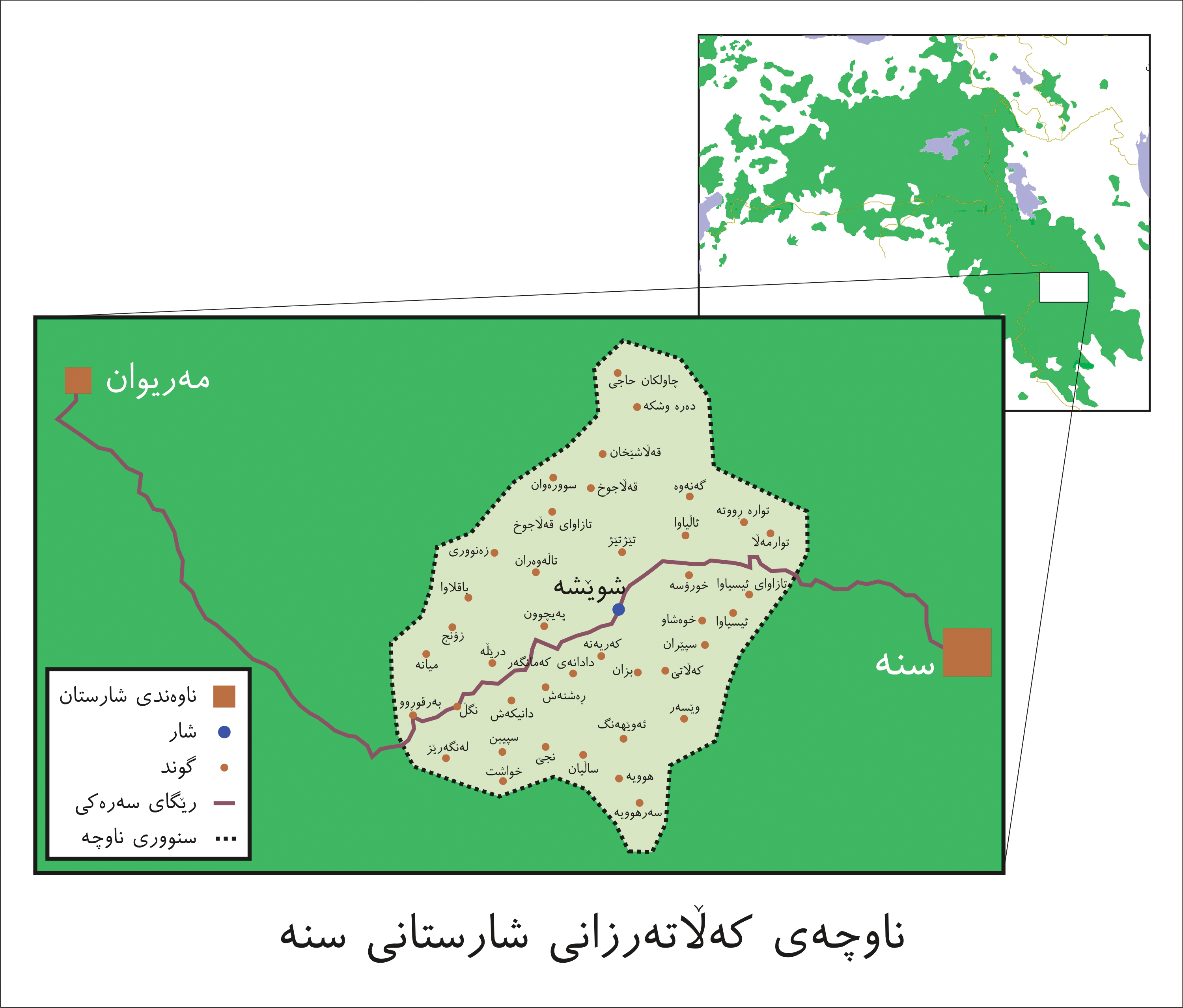
- Kalatarzan map (A region in the county of Sna (Sanandaj), west of Iran)

- Location within Iran
- Coordinates: 35°13′20″N 46°40′27″E
- Country: Iran
- Province: Kurdistan
- County: Sanandaj
- Bakhsh: Kalatrazan
- Rural District: Zhavarud-e Gharbi

Population (2006)
  - Total: 1,149
- Time zone: UTC+3:30 (IRST)
  - Summer (DST): UTC+4:30 (IRDT)

Huyeh (Persian: هويه, also Romanized as Hūyeh, Havyeh, and Hūyah; also known as Huyān) is a village in Zhavarud-e Gharbi Rural District, Kalatrazan District, Sanandaj County, Kurdistan Province, Iran. At the 2006 census, its population was 1,149, in 290 families. The village is populated by Kurds.
