= Golestan Rural District (Falavarjan County) =

Rural district in Isfahan province, Iran

Golestan Rural District Persian: دهستان گلستان
- Rural District
- Location within Iran
- Coordinates: 32°32′N 51°28′E
- Country: Iran
- Province: Isfahan
- County: Falavarjan
- District: Qahderijan
- Established: 1987
- Capital: Qaleh-ye Amir

Population (2016)
  - Total: 3,940
- Time zone: UTC+3:30 (IRST)

Golestan Rural District (Persian: دهستان گلستان) is in Qahderijan District of Falavarjan County, Isfahan province, Iran. Its capital is the village of Qaleh-ye Amir. The previous capital of the rural district was the village of Shervedan (now in Ashtarjan Rural District of the Central District), before which its capital was the village of Garmaseh.

== Demographics ==
=== Population ===
At the time of the 2006 National Census, the rural district's population (as a part of the Central District) was 12,431 in 3,247 households. There were 13,237 inhabitants in 3,883 households at the following census of 2011. The 2016 census measured the population of the rural district as 3,940 in 1,230 households, by which time the rural district had been separated from the district in the formation of Qahderijan District. The most populous of its eight villages was Qaleh-ye Amir, with 1,738 people.

=== Other villages in the rural district ===
- Esfahran
- Karuyeh
