= Zazeran Rural District =

Rural district in Isfahan province, Iran

Zazeran Rural District Persian: دهستان زازران
- Rural District
- Location within Iran
- Coordinates: 32°35′N 51°29′E
- Country: Iran
- Province: Isfahan
- County: Falavarjan
- District: Qahderijan
- Established: 1987
- Capital: Zazeran

Population (2016)
  - Total: 1,985
- Time zone: UTC+3:30 (IRST)

Zazeran Rural District (Persian: دهستان زازران) is in Qahderijan District of Falavarjan County, Isfahan province, Iran. It is administered from the city of Zazeran.

== Demographics ==
=== Population ===
At the time of the 2006 National Census, the rural district's population (as a part of the Central District) was 21,913 in 5,647 households. There were 24,526 inhabitants in 6,992 households at the following census of 2011. The 2016 census measured the population of the rural district as 1,985 in 640 households, by which time the rural district had been separated from the district in the formation of Qahderijan District. The most populous of its 10 villages was Jalalabad-e Marbin, with 1,985 people.
