= Ashtarjan Rural District =

Rural district in Isfahan province, Iran

Ashtarjan Rural District Persian: دهستان اشترجان
- Rural District
- Location within Iran
- Coordinates: 32°30′N 51°29′E
- Country: Iran
- Province: Isfahan
- County: Falavarjan
- District: Central
- Established: 1987
- Capital: Ashtarjan

Population (2016)
  - Total: 23,214
- Time zone: UTC+3:30 (IRST)

Ashtarjan Rural District (Persian: دهستان اشترجان) is in the Central District of Falavarjan County, Isfahan province, Iran. It is administered from the city of Ashtarjan.

== Demographics ==
=== Population ===
At the time of the 2006 National Census, the rural district's population was 13,958 in 3,606 households. There were 14,637 inhabitants in 4,284 households at the following census of 2011. The 2016 census measured the population of the rural district as 23,214 in 7,318 households. The most populous of its 25 villages was Bostan (now the city of Bostan Zar), with 5,309 people.

=== Other villages in the rural district ===
- Bondart
- Dar Afshan
- Dashtlu
- Jilab
- Kavian
- Koruj
- Kheyrabad
- Mehranjan-e Arameneh
- Mehranjan-e Atrak
- Mohammadiyeh
- Shervedan
- Zefreh
