= Qahderijan District =

District in Isfahan province, Iran

Qahderijan District Persian: بخش قهدریجان
- District
- Location within Iran
- Coordinates: 32°33′N 51°28′E
- Country: Iran
- Province: Isfahan
- County: Falavarjan
- Established: 2012
- Capital: Qahderijan

Population (2016)
  - Total: 48,113
- Time zone: UTC+3:30 (IRST)

Qahderijan District (Persian: بخش قهدریجان) is in Falavarjan County, Isfahan province, Iran. Its capital is the city of Qahderijan.

== History ==
In 2012, Golestan and Zazeran Rural Districts, and the city of Qahderijan, were separated from the Central District in the formation of Qahderijan District. The village of Zazeran was converted to a city at the same time.

== Demographics ==
=== Population ===
At the time of the 2016 National Census, the district's population was 48,113 inhabitants in 14,762 households.

=== Administrative divisions ===
Qahderijan District Population
Administrative Divisions	2016
Golestan RD	3,940
Zazeran RD	1,985
Qahderijan (city)	34,226
Zazeran (city)	7,962
Total	48,113
RD = Rural District
