= Pir Bakran District =

District in Isfahan province, Iran

Pir Bakran District Persian: بخش پیربکران
- District
- Location within Iran
- Coordinates: 32°29′N 51°36′E
- Country: Iran
- Province: Isfahan
- County: Falavarjan
- Capital: Pir Bakran

Population (2016)
  - Total: 52,574
- Time zone: UTC+3:30 (IRST)

Pir Bakran District (Persian: بخش پیربکران) (Note: Formerly Garkan-e Shomali District (بخش گرکن شمالی)) is in Falavarjan County, Isfahan province, Iran. Its capital is the city of Pir Bakran.

== History ==
The village of Tad was converted to a city in 2021.

== Demographics ==
=== Population ===
At the time of the 2006 National Census, the district's population was 50,417 in 13,687 households. The following census in 2011 counted 53,425 people in 16,015 households. The 2016 census measured the population of the district as 52,574 inhabitants in 16,795 households.

=== Administrative divisions ===
Pir Bakran District Population
Administrative Divisions	2006	2011	2016
Garkan-e Shomali RD	16,050	16,500	15,115
Sohr and Firuzan RD	13,191	13,601	12,706
Baharan Shahr (city)	10,325	11,132	11,284
Pir Bakran (city)	10,851	12,192	13,469
Tad (city) (Note: Became a city after the 2016 census)			
Total	50,417	53,425	52,574
RD = Rural District
