= Central District (Falavarjan County) =

District in Isfahan province, Iran

Central District (Falavarjan County) Persian: بخش مرکزی شهرستان فلاورجان
- District
- Location within Iran
- Coordinates: 32°31′N 51°30′E
- Country: Iran
- Province: Isfahan
- County: Falavarjan
- Capital: Falavarjan

Population (2016)
  - Total: 149,127
- Time zone: UTC+3:30 (IRST)

The Central District of Falavarjan County (Persian: بخش مرکزی شهرستان فلاورجان) is in Isfahan province, Iran. Its capital is the city of Falavarjan.

== History ==
In 2012, Golestan and Zazeran Rural Districts, and the city of Qahderijan, were separated from the district in the formation of Qahderijan District.

In 2020, the city of Imanshahr was divided into two cities, Ashtarjan and Minadasht. The village of Bostan was converted to a city and renamed Bostan Zar in 2021.

== Demographics ==
=== Population ===
At the time of the 2006 National Census, the district's population was 181,602 in 46,926 households. The following census in 2011 counted 193,589 people in 55,804 households, The 2016 census measured the population of the district as 149,127 inhabitants in 45,656 households.

=== Administrative divisions ===
Central District (Falavarjan County) Population
Administrative Divisions	2006	2011	2016
Abrisham RD	9,414	10,784	25,512
Ashtarjan RD	13,958	14,637	23,214
Golestan RD (Note: Transferred to Qahderijan District after the 2016 census)	12,431	13,237	
Zazeran RD	21,913	24,526	
Abrisham (city)	19,406	21,794	22,429
Ashtarjan (city) (Note: Established after the 2016 census)			
Bostan Zar (city) (Note: Became a city after the 2016 census)			
Falavarjan (city)	37,740	38,310	37,704
Imanshahr (city) (Note: Divided into Ashtarjan and Minadasht cities)	13,535	14,267	14,633
Kelishad and Sudarjan (city)	23,203	24,355	25,635
Minadasht (city)			
Qahderijan (city)	30,002	31,679	
Total	181,602	193,589	149,127
RD = Rural District
