= Falavarjan County =

County in Isfahan province, Iran

Falavarjan County Persian: شهرستان فلاورجان
- County
- Location of Falavarjan County in Isfahan province (center, yellow)

- Location of Isfahan province in Iran
- Coordinates: 32°30′N 51°31′E
- Country: Iran
- Province: Isfahan
- Capital: Falavarjan
- Districts: Central, Pir Bakran, Qahderijan

Area
  - Total: 313 km^{2} (121 sq mi)

Population (2016)
  - Total: 249,814
  - Density: 798/km^{2} (2,070/sq mi)
- Time zone: UTC+3:30 (IRST)

Falavarjan County (Persian: شهرستان فلاورجان) is in Isfahan province, Iran. Its capital is the city of Falavarjan.

== History ==
In 2012, Golestan and Zazeran Rural Districts, and the city of Qahderijan, were separated from the Central District in the formation of Qahderijan District. The village of Zazeran was converted to a city at the same time.

In 2020, the city of Imanshahr was divided into two cities, Ashtarjan and Minadasht. In 2021, the village of Tad was converted to a city, and likewise the village of Bostan, which was renamed Bostan Zar.

== Demographics ==
=== Language ===
The people of this county are Persian-speakers in the Isfahani accent.

=== Population ===
At the time of the 2006 National Census, the county's population was 232,019 in 60,613 households. The following census in 2011 counted 247,014 people in 71,802 households. The 2016 census measured the population of the county as 249,814 in 77,213 households.

=== Administrative divisions ===
Falavarjan County's population history and administrative structure over three consecutive censuses are shown in the following table.

Falavarjan County Population
Administrative Divisions	2006	2011	2016
Central District	181,602	193,589	149,127
Abrisham RD	9,414	10,784	25,512
Ashtarjan RD	13,958	14,637	23,214
Golestan RD	12,431	13,237	
Zazeran RD	21,913	24,526	
Abrisham (city)	19,406	21,794	22,429
Ashtarjan (city) (Note: Established after the 2016 census)			
Bostan Zar (city) (Note: Became a city after the 2016 census)			
Falavarjan (city)	37,740	38,310	37,704
Imanshahr (city) (Note: Divided into Ashtarjan and Minadasht cities)	13,535	14,267	14,633
Kelishad and Sudarjan (city)	23,203	24,355	25,635
Minadasht (city)			
Qahderijan (city)	30,002	31,679	
Pir Bakran District (Note: Formerly Garkan-e Shomali District)	50,417	53,425	52,574
Garkan-e Shomali RD	16,050	16,500	15,115
Sohr and Firuzan RD	13,191	13,601	12,706
Baharan Shahr (city)	10,325	11,132	11,284
Pir Bakran (city)	10,851	12,192	13,469
Tad (city) (Note: Became a city after the 2016 census)			
Qahderijan District			48,113
Golestan RD			3,940
Zazeran RD			1,985
Qahderijan (city)			34,226
Zazeran (city)			7,962
Total	232,019	247,014	249,814
RD = Rural District

== Overview ==
The city of Falavarjan has a special place due to its close proximity to the metropolis of Isfahan. Also, due to its proximity to the Zobahan highway and ease of connection with other neighboring cities, it is one of the busiest suburbs of Isfahan. The bridge of this city which is called Vargon is the only double arched bridge of Zayandehrood.

The most important historical structures in the county are in the Pirbakran Mausoleum, and the historical mosque of the village of Oshtorjan (now the city of Imanshahr).

The city of Falavarjan has a long history and is one of the oldest central parts of Isfahan. It has also been a place for many migratory animals and birds due to its unique and pleasant climate.

Falavarjan city is one of the historical cities of Isfahan province with a total area of 319 square kilometers. The city has a wide bank of the Zayandeh River, which is very important in this regard. The soil of Falavarjan in the past was very coastal and fertile, and this has led to great prosperity in agriculture, especially rice cultivation. However, despite the recent drought, the city's cultivated lands gradually declined.

It is bounded on the east by Isfahan County, on the north by Khomeyni Shahr County, on the south by Mobarakeh County, on the northwest by Najafabad County, and on the west by Lenjan County.

Existence of numerous industries, being located on the banks of Zayandeh River, long history and high quality agricultural products such as rice, wheat and summer crops have made this city have a special place. This city has 8 cities named Zazran, Falavarjan, Qahdarijan, Kalishad, Sudarjan, Pirbakran, Baharan, Imanshahr, Abrisham city and 60 villages, which according to the historical monuments in these cities have a long cultural history.

In the past, especially since the constitutional period, a number of Bakhtiari people have also settled in Falavarjan. Historical monuments of this city can be Imamzadeh Younes Ibn Azharban Aqeel Ibn Musa Kazem of Zazran city, the house of evidence of Zafra village, old Falavarjan bridge and Grand Mosque and Baba Mahmoud Sohr Firuzan bridge and Largan pigeon towers and Hoyeh village and stone lions and Baba Mahmoud Sohr Firuzan mosque and mosque Ashtarjan and the tomb of Pirbakran and the tomb of Imamzadeh Shah Abul Ghasem Sohr Firoozan, Seyyed Mohammad Largan and Zeid Ibn Hassan were named.

Also, from the Safavid period, a wall started near the city of Pirbakran and continued until the end of the city of Imanshahr (Minadasht).Over time, this mud wall has been destroyed, but part of this wall is still left. Falavarjan has been less developed due to its proximity to the city of Isfahan. It is noteworthy that the historical bridge of Faladerjan has been built with the use of eggs and salts such as cement, etc., and if the Zayandeh River does not reach these bridges, they may be destroyed due to drought. Unfortunately, this city is surrounded by drought.

== Transportation ==
The main route passing through the county is Zobahan Freeway, connecting population centres to Isfahan.

Falavarjan County has its own Transit Bus system named Falavarjan County Municipalities Mass Transit Organization, running 7 routes connecting the county's cities to Isfahan and one route to Khomeynishahr.

== Universities ==
The Islamic Azad University of Falavarjan was founded in Falavarjan County, 1984.

== See also ==
Media related to Falavarjan County at Wikimedia Commons
