= Tokhmaqlu =

Village in Isfahan province, Iran

Tokhmaqlu Persian: تخماقلو
- Village
- Location within Iran
- Coordinates: 33°11′43″N 50°07′54″E
- Country: Iran
- Province: Isfahan
- County: Buin Miandasht
- District: Karchambu
- Rural District: Karchambu-ye Shomali

Population (2016)
  - Total: 288
- Time zone: UTC+3:30 (IRST)

Tokhmaqlu (Persian: تخماقلو) (Note: Also romanized as Tokhmāqlū; also known as Tokhmāghlū and Tukhm Āqlu) is a village in Karchambu-ye Shomali Rural District of Karchambu District in Buin Miandasht County, Isfahan province, Iran.

== Demographics ==
=== Population ===
At the time of the 2006 National Census, the village's population was 533 in 129 households, when it was in the former Buin Miandasht District of Faridan County. The following census in 2011 counted 394 people in 136 households. The 2016 census measured the population of the village as 288 people in 117 households, by which time the district had been separated from the county in the establishment of Buin Miandasht County. The rural district was transferred to the new Karchambu District.
