= Qaemabad, Isfahan =

Village in Isfahan province, Iran

Qaemabad Persian: قائم اباد
- Village
- Location within Iran
- Coordinates: 33°08′34″N 50°02′21″E
- Country: Iran
- Province: Isfahan
- County: Buin Miandasht
- District: Central
- Rural District: Yeylaq

Population (2016)
  - Total: 773
- Time zone: UTC+3:30 (IRST)

Qaemabad (Persian: قائم اباد) (Note: Also romanized as Qā’emābād and Qa’emābād; also known as Qa’emābād Shāh Yūrdī, Qaimabad (قايم آباد), Shāh Vardī, Shāh Yūrdī, Shahivardi, Shāhverdī, and Shāhyowrdī) is a village in Yeylaq Rural District of the Central District in Buin Miandasht County, Isfahan province, Iran.

== Demographics ==
=== Population ===
At the time of the 2006 National Census, the village's population was 1,186 in 226 households, when it was in the former Buin Miandasht District of Faridan County. The following census in 2011 counted 946 people in 267 households. The 2016 census measured the population of the village as 773 people in 278 households, by which time the district had been separated from the county in the establishment of Buin Miandasht County. The rural district was transferred to the new Central District.
