= Qaleh-ye Khvajeh (disambiguation) =

Qaleh-ye Khvajeh is a city in Khuzestan Province, Iran.

Qaleh-ye Khvajeh or Qaleh Khvajeh (Persian: قلعه خواجه) may also refer to:

- Qaleh-ye Khvajeh, Fars
- Qaleh Khvajeh, Isfahan
- Qaleh Khvajeh, Tehran
- Qaleh-ye Khvajeh Rural District, in Khuzestan Province
