= Khalili, Isfahan =

Village in Isfahan province, Iran

Khalili Persian: خليلی
- Village
- Location within Iran
- Coordinates: 33°11′02″N 50°09′42″E
- Country: Iran
- Province: Isfahan
- County: Buin Miandasht
- District: Central
- Rural District: Sardsir

Population (2016)
  - Total: 165
- Time zone: UTC+3:30 (IRST)

Khalili (Persian: خليلی) (Note: Also romanized as Khalīlī) is a village in Sardsir Rural District of the Central District in Buin Miandasht County, Isfahan province, Iran.

== Demographics ==
=== Population ===
At the time of the 2006 National Census, the village's population was 222 in 72 households, when it was in the former Buin Miandasht District of Faridan County. The following census in 2011 counted 177 people in 61 households. The 2016 census measured the population of the village as 165 people in 68 households, by which time the district had been separated from the county in the establishment of Buin Miandasht County. The rural district was transferred to the new Central District.
