= Qaleh Ekhlas =

Village in Isfahan province, Iran

Qaleh Ekhlas Persian: قلعه اخلاص
- Village
- Location within Iran
- Coordinates: 33°10′24″N 49°59′57″E
- Country: Iran
- Province: Isfahan
- County: Buin Miandasht
- District: Karchambu
- Rural District: Karchambu-ye Jonubi

Population (2016)
  - Total: 137
- Time zone: UTC+3:30 (IRST)

Qaleh Ekhlas (Persian: قلعه اخلاص) (Note: Also romanized as Qal‘eh Ekhlāş; also known as Ghal‘eh Ekhlas) is a village in Karchambu-ye Jonubi Rural District of Karchambu District in Buin Miandasht County, Isfahan province, Iran.

== Demographics ==
=== Population ===
At the time of the 2006 National Census, the village's population was 250 in 53 households, when it was in the former Buin Miandasht District of Faridan County. The following census in 2011 counted 164 people in 45 households. The 2016 census measured the population of the village as 137 people in 54 households, by which time the district had been separated from the county in the establishment of Buin Miandasht County. The rural district was transferred to the new Karchambu District.
