= Hoseynabad, Buin Miandasht =

Village in Isfahan province, Iran

Hoseynabad Persian: حسين اباد
- Village
- Location within Iran
- Coordinates: 33°09′43″N 50°15′10″E
- Country: Iran
- Province: Isfahan
- County: Buin Miandasht
- District: Central
- Rural District: Sardsir

Population (2016)
  - Total: 215
- Time zone: UTC+3:30 (IRST)

Hoseynabad (Persian: حسين اباد) (Note: Also romanized as Hosein Abad and Ḩoseynābād) is a village in Sardsir Rural District of the Central District in Buin Miandasht County, Isfahan province, Iran.

== Demographics ==
=== Population ===
At the time of the 2006 National Census, the village's population was 201 in 53 households, when it was in the former Buin Miandasht District of Faridan County. The following census in 2011 counted 162 people in 48 households. The 2016 census measured the population of the village as 215 people in 66 households, by which time the district had been separated from the county in the establishment of Buin Miandasht County. The rural district was transferred to the new Central District.
