= Darreh Sari =

Village in Isfahan province, Iran

Darreh Sari Persian: دره ساري
- Village
- Location within Iran
- Coordinates: 33°14′30″N 49°58′30″E
- Country: Iran
- Province: Isfahan
- County: Buin Miandasht
- District: Karchambu
- Rural District: Karchambu-ye Jonubi

Population (2016)
  - Total: 94
- Time zone: UTC+3:30 (IRST)

Darreh Sari (Persian: دره ساري) (Note: Also romanized as Darreh Sārī and Darreh-ye Sārī) is a village in Karchambu-ye Jonubi Rural District of Karchambu District in Buin Miandasht County, Isfahan province, Iran.

== Demographics ==
=== Population ===
At the time of the 2006 National Census, the village's population was 102 in 22 households, when it was in the former Buin Miandasht District of Faridan County. The following census in 2011 counted 67 people in 19 households. The 2016 census measured the population of the village as 94 people in 33 households, by which time the district had been separated from the county in the establishment of Buin Miandasht County. The rural district was transferred to the new Karchambu District.
