= Basinan =

Village in Isfahan province, Iran

Basinan Persian: بسي نان
- Village
- Location within Iran
- Coordinates: 33°12′25″N 50°07′59″E
- Country: Iran
- Province: Isfahan
- County: Buin Miandasht
- District: Karchambu
- Rural District: Karchambu-ye Shomali

Population (2016)
  - Total: 71
- Time zone: UTC+3:30 (IRST)

Basinan (Persian: بسي نان) (Note: Also romanized as Basīnān; also known as Sī Nān) is a village in Karchambu-ye Shomali Rural District of Karchambu District in Buin Miandasht County, Isfahan province, Iran.

== Demographics ==
=== Population ===
At the time of the 2006 National Census, the village's population was 119 in 33 households, when it was in the former Buin Miandasht District of Faridan County. The following census in 2011 counted 83 people in 34 households. The 2016 census measured the population of the village as 71 people in 38 households, by which time the district had been separated from the county in the establishment of Buin Miandasht County. The rural district was transferred to the new Karchambu District.
