= Marbar =

Village in Isfahan province, Iran

Marbar Persian: ماربر
- Village
- Location within Iran
- Coordinates: 33°10′34″N 50°11′22″E
- Country: Iran
- Province: Isfahan
- County: Buin Miandasht
- District: Central
- Rural District: Sardsir

Population (2016)
  - Total: 155
- Time zone: UTC+3:30 (IRST)

Marbar (Persian: ماربر) (Note: Also romanized as Mār Bor and Mārbar; also known as Mālbor, Mār Boz, and Mār Bur) is a village in Sardsir Rural District of the Central District in Buin Miandasht County, Isfahan province, Iran.

== Demographics ==
=== Population ===
At the time of the 2006 National Census, the village's population was 286 in 85 households, when it was in the former Buin Miandasht District of Faridan County. The following census in 2011 counted 183 people in 73 households. The 2016 census measured the population of the village as 155 people in 72 households, by which time the district had been separated from the county in the establishment of Buin Miandasht County. The rural district was transferred to the new Central District.
