= Hendukosh =

Village in Isfahan province, Iran

Hendukosh Persian: هندوكش
- Village
- Location within Iran
- Coordinates: 33°16′10″N 50°02′38″E
- Country: Iran
- Province: Isfahan
- County: Buin Miandasht
- District: Karchambu
- Rural District: Karchambu-ye Shomali

Population (2016)
  - Total: 598
- Time zone: UTC+3:30 (IRST)

Hendukosh (Persian: هندوكش) (Note: Also romanized as Hendookosh and Hendūkosh; also known as Hendī Kosh and Hindūkush) is a village in Karchambu-ye Shomali Rural District of Karchambu District in Buin Miandasht County, Isfahan province, Iran.

== Demographics ==
=== Population ===
At the time of the 2006 National Census, the village's population was 1,076 in 199 households, when it was in the former Buin Miandasht District of Faridan County. The following census in 2011 counted 817 people in 216 households. The 2016 census measured the population of the village as 598 people in 173 households, by which time the district had been separated from the county in the establishment of Buin Miandasht County. The rural district was transferred to the new Karchambu District. Hendukosh was the most populous village in its rural district.
