= Tir Kert =

Village in Isfahan province, Iran

Tir Kert Persian: تيركرت
- Village
- Location within Iran
- Coordinates: 33°10′58″N 50°01′48″E
- Country: Iran
- Province: Isfahan
- County: Buin Miandasht
- District: Karchambu
- Rural District: Karchambu-ye Jonubi

Population (2016)
  - Total: 95
- Time zone: UTC+3:30 (IRST)

Tir Kert (Persian: تيركرت) (Note: Also romanized as Tīr Kart and Tīr Kert; also known as Tī Kert) is a village in Karchambu-ye Jonubi Rural District of Karchambu District in Buin Miandasht County, Isfahan province, Iran.

== Demographics ==
=== Population ===
At the time of the 2006 National Census, the village's population was 250 in 45 households, when it was in the former Buin Miandasht District of Faridan County. The following census in 2011 counted 154 people in 40 households. The 2016 census measured the population of the village as 95 people in 33 households, by which time the district had been separated from the county in the establishment of Buin Miandasht County. The rural district was transferred to the new Karchambu District.
