= Masumabad, Buin Miandasht =

Village in Isfahan province, Iran

Masumabad Persian: معصوم اباد
- Village
- Location within Iran
- Coordinates: 33°07′02″N 50°13′35″E
- Country: Iran
- Province: Isfahan
- County: Buin Miandasht
- District: Central
- Rural District: Sardsir

Population (2016)
  - Total: 436
- Time zone: UTC+3:30 (IRST)

Masumabad (Persian: معصوم اباد) (Note: Also romanized as Ma‘şūmābād; also known as Shāh ‘Enāyat, Shah ‘Ināyat, and Shahīd Sargord Ma‘şūmī) is a village in Sardsir Rural District of the Central District in Buin Miandasht County, Isfahan province, Iran.

== Demographics ==
=== Population ===
At the time of the 2006 National Census, the village's population was 526 in 126 households, when it was in the former Buin Miandasht District of Faridan County. The following census in 2011 counted 440 people in 126 households. The 2016 census measured the population of the village as 436 people in 149 households, by which time the district had been separated from the county in the establishment of Buin Miandasht County. The rural district was transferred to the new Central District.
