= Hadan =

Village in Isfahan province, Iran

Hadan Persian: هادان
- Village
- Location within Iran
- Coordinates: 33°07′22″N 50°14′45″E
- Country: Iran
- Province: Isfahan
- County: Buin Miandasht
- District: Central
- Rural District: Sardsir

Population (2016)
  - Total: 421
- Time zone: UTC+3:30 (IRST)

Hadan (Persian: هادان) (Note: Also romanized as Hādān and Hadān; also known as Ardūn, Hādūn, and Hāvān) is a village in Sardsir Rural District of the Central District in Buin Miandasht County, Isfahan province, Iran.

Hadan is part of a larger region known as Fereydan (Persian: فریدن; Armenian: Փերիա). Up until the 1990s, the village was historically populated by Armenians brought to this part of Iran by Shah Abbas of the Safavid dynasty in 1603 and 1604, following the Nakhchivan deportations.

== Demographics ==
=== Population ===
At the time of the 2006 National Census, the village's population was 498 in 115 households, when it was in the former Buin Miandasht District of Faridan County. The following census in 2011 counted 408 people in 122 households. The 2016 census measured the population of the village as 421 people in 139 households, by which time the district had been separated from the county in the establishment of Buin Miandasht County. The rural district was transferred to the new Central District.
