= Bagh Madi =

Village in Isfahan province, Iran

Bagh Madi Persian: باغ مادي
- Village
- Location within Iran
- Coordinates: 33°09′37″N 49°56′08″E
- Country: Iran
- Province: Isfahan
- County: Buin Miandasht
- District: Karchambu
- Rural District: Karchambu-ye Jonubi

Population (2016)
  - Total: 105
- Time zone: UTC+3:30 (IRST)

Bagh Madi (Persian: باغ مادي) (Note: Also romanized as Bāgh Mādī; also known as Bāgh-e ‘Emādī) is a village in Karchambu-ye Jonubi Rural District of Karchambu District in Buin Miandasht County, Isfahan province, Iran.

== Demographics ==
=== Population ===
At the time of the 2006 National Census, the village's population was 100 in 25 households, when it was in the former Buin Miandasht District of Faridan County. The following census in 2011 counted 93 people in 24 households. The 2016 census measured the population of the village as 105 people in 31 households, by which time the district had been separated from the county in the establishment of Buin Miandasht County. The rural district was transferred to the new Karchambu District.
