= Darreh Howz =

Village in Isfahan province, Iran

Darreh Howz Persian: دره حوض
- Village
- Location within Iran
- Coordinates: 33°12′13″N 49°55′35″E
- Country: Iran
- Province: Isfahan
- County: Buin Miandasht
- District: Karchambu
- Rural District: Karchambu-ye Jonubi

Population (2016)
  - Total: 141
- Time zone: UTC+3:30 (IRST)

Darreh Howz (Persian: دره حوض) (Note: Also romanized as Darreh Ḩowẕ; also known as ‘Abdolābād) is a village in Karchambu-ye Jonubi Rural District of Karchambu District in Buin Miandasht County, Isfahan province, Iran.

== Demographics ==
=== Population ===
At the time of the 2006 National Census, the village's population was 194 in 39 households, when it was in the former Buin Miandasht District of Faridan County. The following census in 2011 counted 169 people in 45 households. The 2016 census measured the population of the village as 141 people in 43 households, by which time the district had been separated from the county in the establishment of Buin Miandasht County. The rural district was transferred to the new Karchambu District.
