= Deh-e Rajab =

Village in Isfahan province, Iran

Deh-e Rajab Persian: ده رجب
- Village
- Location within Iran
- Coordinates: 33°09′04″N 50°16′56″E
- Country: Iran
- Province: Isfahan
- County: Buin Miandasht
- District: Central
- Rural District: Sardsir

Population (2016)
  - Total: 110
- Time zone: UTC+3:30 (IRST)

Deh-e Rajab (Persian: ده رجب) is a village in Sardsir Rural District of the Central District in Buin Miandasht County, Isfahan province, Iran.

== Demographics ==
=== Population ===
At the time of the 2006 National Census, the village's population was 189 in 45 households, when it was in the former Buin Miandasht District of Faridan County. The following census in 2011 counted 130 people in 41 households. The 2016 census measured the population of the village as 110 people in 45 households, by which time the district had been separated from the county in the establishment of Buin Miandasht County. The rural district was transferred to the new Central District.
