= Boltaq =

Village in Isfahan province, Iran

Boltaq Persian: بلطاق
- Village
- Location within Iran
- Coordinates: 33°09′17″N 49°59′44″E
- Country: Iran
- Province: Isfahan
- County: Buin Miandasht
- District: Karchambu
- Rural District: Karchambu-ye Jonubi

Population (2016)
  - Total: 1,462
- Time zone: UTC+3:30 (IRST)

Boltaq (Persian: بلطاق) (Note: Also romanized as Balţāq and Bolţāq; also known as Baltagh) is a village in, and the capital of, Karchambu-ye Jonubi Rural District in Karchambu District of Buin Miandasht County, Isfahan province, Iran.

== Demographics ==
=== Population ===
At the time of the 2006 National Census, the village's population was 1,323 in 296 households, when it was in the former Buin Miandasht District of Faridan County. The following census in 2011 counted 1,224 people in 328 households. The 2016 census measured the population of the village as 1,462 people in 458 households, by which time the district had been separated from the county in the establishment of Buin Miandasht County. The rural district was transferred to the new Karchambu District. Boltaq was the most populous village in its rural district.
