= Darreh Sukhteh =

Village in Isfahan province, Iran

Darreh Sukhteh Persian: دره سوخته
- Village
- Location within Iran
- Coordinates: 33°13′45″N 50°06′03″E
- Country: Iran
- Province: Isfahan
- County: Buin Miandasht
- District: Karchambu
- Rural District: Karchambu-ye Shomali

Population (2016)
  - Total: 74
- Time zone: UTC+3:30 (IRST)

Darreh Sukhteh (Persian: دره سوخته) (Note: Also romanized as Darreh Sookhteh and Darreh Sūkhteh) is a village in Karchambu-ye Shomali Rural District of Karchambu District in Buin Miandasht County, Isfahan province, Iran.

== Demographics ==
=== Population ===
At the time of the 2006 National Census, the village's population was 109 in 27 households, when it was in the former Buin Miandasht District of Faridan County. The following census in 2011 counted 84 people in 28 households. The 2016 census measured the population of the village as 74 people in 31 households, by which time the district had been separated from the county in the establishment of Buin Miandasht County. The rural district was transferred to the new Karchambu District.
