= Qarah Boltaq =

Village in Isfahan province, Iran

Qarah Boltaq Persian: قره بلطاق
- Village
- Location within Iran
- Coordinates: 33°08′58″N 50°13′02″E
- Country: Iran
- Province: Isfahan
- County: Buin Miandasht
- District: Central
- Rural District: Sardsir

Population (2016)
  - Total: 553
- Time zone: UTC+3:30 (IRST)

Qarah Boltaq (Persian: قره بلطاق) (Note: Also romanized as Qarah Bolţāq and Qareh Bolţāq; also known as Ghareh Boltagh, Kareh Būltā, Qarah Bultāq, Qareh Bolţāq-e Bozorg, and Qareh Būltā) is a village in, and the capital of, Sardsir Rural District in the Central District of Buin Miandasht County, Isfahan province, Iran.

== Demographics ==
=== Population ===
At the time of the 2006 National Census, the village's population was 698 in 190 households, when it was in the former Buin Miandasht District of Faridan County. The following census in 2011 counted 570 people in 179 households. The 2016 census measured the population of the village as 553 people in 208 households, by which time the district had been separated from the county in the establishment of Buin Miandasht County. The rural district was transferred to the new Central District. It was the most populous village in its rural district.
