= Aznavleh, Isfahan =

Village in Isfahan province, Iran

Aznavleh Persian: ازناوله
- Village
- Location within Iran
- Coordinates: 33°06′19″N 50°06′59″E
- Country: Iran
- Province: Isfahan
- County: Buin Miandasht
- District: Central
- Rural District: Yeylaq

Population (2016)
  - Total: 561
- Time zone: UTC+3:30 (IRST)

Aznavleh (Persian: ازناوله) (Note: Also romanized as Aznāvaleh and Aznāvleh; also known as Aznarāleh and Aznazāleh) is a village in, and the capital of, Yeylaq Rural District in the Central District of Buin Miandasht County, Isfahan province, Iran.

== Demographics ==
=== Population ===
At the time of the 2006 National Census, the village's population was 640 in 125 households, when it was in the former Buin Miandasht District of Faridan County. The following census in 2011 counted 543 people in 155 households. The 2016 census measured the population of the village as 561 people in 185 households, by which time the district had been separated from the county in the establishment of Buin Miandasht County. The rural district was transferred to the new Central District.
