= Artijan =

Village in Isfahan province, Iran

Artijan Persian: ارتي جان
- Village
- Location within Iran
- Coordinates: 33°07′40″N 50°18′14″E
- Country: Iran
- Province: Isfahan
- County: Buin Miandasht
- District: Central
- Rural District: Sardsir

Population (2016)
  - Total: 71
- Time zone: UTC+3:30 (IRST)

Artijan (Persian: ارتي جان) (Note: Also romanized as Ārtījān and Artījān; also known as Artejān) is a village in Sardsir Rural District of the Central District in Buin Miandasht County, Isfahan province, Iran.

== Demographics ==
=== Population ===
At the time of the 2006 National Census, the village's population was 96 in 32 households, when it was in the former Buin Miandasht District of Faridan County. The following census in 2011 counted 56 people in 18 households. The 2016 census measured the population of the village as 71 people in 31 households, by which time the district had been separated from the county in the establishment of Buin Miandasht County. The rural district was transferred to the new Central District.
