= Qaleh Bahman, Isfahan =

Village in Isfahan province, Iran

Qaleh Bahman Persian: قلعه بهمن
- Village
- Location within Iran
- Coordinates: 33°12′28″N 50°10′52″E
- Country: Iran
- Province: Isfahan
- County: Buin Miandasht
- District: Karchambu
- Rural District: Karchambu-ye Shomali

Population (2016)
  - Total: 92
- Time zone: UTC+3:30 (IRST)

Qaleh Bahman (Persian: قلعه بهمن) (Note: Also romanized as Qal‘eh Bahman; also known as Ghal‘eh Bahman) is a village in Karchambu-ye Shomali Rural District of Karchambu District in Buin Miandasht County, Isfahan province, Iran.

== Demographics ==
=== Population ===
At the time of the 2006 National Census, the village's population was 192 in 44 households, when it was in the former Buin Miandasht District of Faridan County. The following census in 2011 counted 129 people in 40 households. The 2016 census measured the population of the village as 92 people in 42 households, by which time the district had been separated from the county in the establishment of Buin Miandasht County. The rural district was transferred to the new Karchambu District.
