= Kerch, Isfahan =

Village in Isfahan province, Iran

Kerch Persian: كرچ
- Village
- Location within Iran
- Coordinates: 33°12′58″N 50°05′19″E
- Country: Iran
- Province: Isfahan
- County: Buin Miandasht
- District: Karchambu
- Rural District: Karchambu-ye Shomali

Population (2016)
  - Total: 313
- Time zone: UTC+3:30 (IRST)

Kerch (Persian: كرچ) (Note: Also known as Kīrch) is a village in, and the capital of, Karchambu-ye Shomali Rural District in Karchambu District of Buin Miandasht County, Isfahan province, Iran.

== Demographics ==
=== Population ===
At the time of the 2006 National Census, the village's population was 464 in 95 households, when it was in the former Buin Miandasht District of Faridan County. The following census in 2011 counted 363 people in 115 households. The 2016 census measured the population of the village as 313 people in 113 households, by which time the district had been separated from the county in the establishment of Buin Miandasht County. The rural district was transferred to the new Karchambu District.
