= Mirabad, Buin Miandasht =

Village in Isfahan province, Iran

Mirabad Persian: ميراباد
- Village
- Location within Iran
- Coordinates: 33°04′47″N 50°14′11″E
- Country: Iran
- Province: Isfahan
- County: Buin Miandasht
- District: Central
- Rural District: Sardsir

Population (2016)
  - Total: 536
- Time zone: UTC+3:30 (IRST)

Mirabad (Persian: ميراباد) (Note: Also romanized as Mīrābād; also known as Nurābād) is a village in Sardsir Rural District of the Central District in Buin Miandasht County, Isfahan province, Iran.

== Demographics ==
=== Population ===
At the time of the 2006 National Census, the village's population was 659 in 156 households, when it was in the former Buin Miandasht District of Faridan County. The following census in 2011 counted 618 people in 193 households. The 2016 census measured the population of the village as 536 people in 184 households, by which time the district had been separated from the county in the establishment of Buin Miandasht County. The rural district was transferred to the new Central District.
