= Qaleh Khvajeh (disambiguation) =

Qaleh Khvajeh or Qaleh-ye Khvajeh (Persian: قلعه خواجه) may refer to several places in Iran:

== Fars province ==
- Qaleh-ye Khvajeh, Fars, a village in Neyriz County

== Isfahan province ==
- Qaleh Khvajeh, Isfahan, a village in Buin Miandasht County

== Khuzestan province ==
- Qaleh-ye Khvajeh, a city in Andika County

== Tehran province ==
- Qaleh Khvajeh, Tehran, a village in Varamin County
