= Betlijeh =

Village in Isfahan province, Iran

Betlijeh Persian: بتليجه
- Village
- Location within Iran
- Coordinates: 33°15′07″N 50°05′05″E
- Country: Iran
- Province: Isfahan
- County: Buin Miandasht
- District: Karchambu
- Rural District: Karchambu-ye Shomali

Population (2016)
  - Total: 228
- Time zone: UTC+3:30 (IRST)

Betlijeh (Persian: بتليجه) (Note: Also romanized as Betlījeh; also known as Baltagh, Belītjā, Beltīcheh, Beltījeh, and Bīltījeh) is a village in Karchambu-ye Shomali Rural District of Karchambu District in Buin Miandasht County, Isfahan province, Iran.

== Demographics ==
=== Population ===
At the time of the 2006 National Census, the village's population was 338 in 84 households, when it was in the former Buin Miandasht District of Faridan County. The following census in 2011 counted 196 people in 62 households. The 2016 census measured the population of the village as 228 people in 90 households, by which time the district had been separated from the county in the establishment of Buin Miandasht County. The rural district was transferred to the new Karchambu District.
