= Khalat Pushan =

Village in Isfahan province, Iran

Khalat Pushan Persian: خلعت پوشان
- Village
- Location within Iran
- Coordinates: 33°08′40″N 49°53′34″E
- Country: Iran
- Province: Isfahan
- County: Buin Miandasht
- District: Karchambu
- Rural District: Karchambu-ye Jonubi

Population (2016)
  - Total: Below reporting threshold
- Time zone: UTC+3:30 (IRST)

Khalat Pushan (Persian: خلعت پوشان) (Note: Also romanized as Khal‘at Pooshan and Khal‘at Pūshān) is a village in Karchambu-ye Jonubi Rural District of Karchambu District in Buin Miandasht County, Isfahan province, Iran.

== Demographics ==
=== Population ===
At the time of the 2006 National Census, the village's population was 73 in 17 households, when it was in the former Buin Miandasht District of Faridan County. The following census in 2011 counted 53 people in 14 households. The 2016 census measured the population of the village as below the reporting threshold, by which time the district had been separated from the county in the establishment of Buin Miandasht County. The rural district was transferred to the new Karchambu District.
