= Helaghareh =

Village in Isfahan province, Iran

Helaghareh Persian: هلاغره
- Village
- Location within Iran
- Coordinates: 33°13′32″N 50°10′10″E
- Country: Iran
- Province: Isfahan
- County: Buin Miandasht
- District: Karchambu
- Rural District: Karchambu-ye Shomali

Population (2016)
  - Total: 132
- Time zone: UTC+3:30 (IRST)

Helaghareh (Persian: هلاغره) (Note: Also romanized as Halā Ghorreh, Halāgharreh, and Helāghareh; also known as Hilla Ghurreh) is a village in Karchambu-ye Shomali Rural District of Karchambu District in Buin Miandasht County, Isfahan province, Iran.

== Demographics ==
=== Population ===
At the time of the 2006 National Census, the village's population was 154 in 44 households, when it was in the former Buin Miandasht District of Faridan County. The following census in 2011 counted 116 people in 36 households. The 2016 census measured the population of the village as 132 people in 58 households, by which time the district had been separated from the county in the establishment of Buin Miandasht County. The rural district was transferred to the new Karchambu District.
