= Jowzar, Isfahan =

Village in Isfahan province, Iran

Jowzar Persian: جوزار
- Village
- Location within Iran
- Coordinates: 33°12′18″N 50°13′36″E
- Country: Iran
- Province: Isfahan
- County: Buin Miandasht
- District: Central
- Rural District: Sardsir

Population (2016)
  - Total: 38
- Time zone: UTC+3:30 (IRST)

Jowzar (Persian: جوزار) (Note: Also romanized as Jowzār) is a village in Sardsir Rural District of the Central District in Buin Miandasht County, Isfahan province, Iran.

== Demographics ==
=== Population ===
At the time of the 2006 National Census, the village's population was 71 in 18 households, when it was in the former Buin Miandasht District of Faridan County. The following census in 2011 counted 41 people in 14 households. The 2016 census measured the population of the village as 38 people in 14 households, by which time the district had been separated from the county in the establishment of Buin Miandasht County. The rural district was transferred to the new Central District.
