= Aqa Gol =

Village in Isfahan province, Iran

Aqa Gol Persian: اقاگل
- Village
- Location within Iran
- Coordinates: 33°05′46″N 49°58′41″E
- Country: Iran
- Province: Isfahan
- County: Buin Miandasht
- District: Central
- Rural District: Yeylaq

Population (2016)
  - Total: 257
- Time zone: UTC+3:30 (IRST)

Aqa Gol (Persian: اقاگل) (Note: Also romanized as Āqā Gol) is a village in Yeylaq Rural District of the Central District in Buin Miandasht County, Isfahan province, Iran.

== Demographics ==
=== Population ===
At the time of the 2006 National Census, the village's population was 389 in 71 households, when it was in the former Buin Miandasht District of Faridan County. The following census in 2011 counted 274 people in 70 households. The 2016 census measured the population of the village as 257 people in 79 households, by which time the district had been separated from the county in the establishment of Buin Miandasht County. The rural district was transferred to the new Central District.
