= Tang-e Bid =

Village in Isfahan province, Iran

Tang-e Bid Persian: تنگ بيد
- Village
- Location within Iran
- Coordinates: 33°07′25″N 49°55′42″E
- Country: Iran
- Province: Isfahan
- County: Buin Miandasht
- District: Central
- Rural District: Yeylaq

Population (2016)
  - Total: 42
- Time zone: UTC+3:30 (IRST)

Tang-e Bid (Persian: تنگ بيد) (Note: Also romanized as Tang-e Bīd) is a village in Yeylaq Rural District of the Central District in Buin Miandasht County, Isfahan province, Iran.

== Demographics ==
=== Population ===
At the time of the 2006 National Census, the village's population was 36 in seven households, when it was in the former Buin Miandasht District of Faridan County. The following census in 2011 counted 82 people in 18 households. The 2016 census measured the population of the village as 42 people in 12 households, by which time the district had been separated from the county in the establishment of Buin Miandasht County. The rural district was transferred to the new Central District.
