= Hezar Jarib, Isfahan =

Village in Isfahan province, Iran

Hezar Jarib Persian: هزارجريب
- Village
- Location within Iran
- Coordinates: 33°06′22″N 50°03′19″E
- Country: Iran
- Province: Isfahan
- County: Buin Miandasht
- District: Central
- Rural District: Yeylaq

Population (2016)
  - Total: 204
- Time zone: UTC+3:30 (IRST)

Hezar Jarib (Persian: هزارجريب) (Note: Also romanized as Hazār Jerīb, Hazārjarīb, Hezār Jarīb, and Hezār Jerīb) is a village in Yeylaq Rural District of the Central District in Buin Miandasht County, Isfahan province, Iran.

== Demographics ==
=== Population ===
At the time of the 2006 National Census, the village's population was 318 in 50 households, when it was in the former Buin Miandasht District of Faridan County. The following census in 2011 counted 237 people in 58 households. The 2016 census measured the population of the village as 204 people in 54 households, by which time the district had been separated from the county in the establishment of Buin Miandasht County. The rural district was transferred to the new Central District.
