= Hajji Fath Ali =

Village in Isfahan province, Iran

Hajji Fath Ali Persian: حاجي فتحعلي
- Village
- Location within Iran
- Coordinates: 33°05′38″N 50°01′27″E
- Country: Iran
- Province: Isfahan
- County: Buin Miandasht
- District: Central
- Rural District: Yeylaq

Population (2016)
  - Total: 117
- Time zone: UTC+3:30 (IRST)

Hajji Fath Ali (Persian: حاجي فتحعلي) (Note: Also romanized as Ḩājī Fatḩ ‘Alī and Ḩājjī Fatḩ ‘Alī; also known as Haj Fat-hali and Ḩājj Fatḩ ‘Alī) is a village in Yeylaq Rural District of the Central District in Buin Miandasht County, Isfahan province, Iran.

== Demographics ==
=== Population ===
At the time of the 2006 National Census, the village's population was 167 in 23 households, when it was in the former Buin Miandasht District of Faridan County. The following census in 2011 counted 117 people in 27 households. The 2016 census measured the population of the village as 117 people in 39 households, by which time the district had been separated from the county in the establishment of Buin Miandasht County. The rural district was transferred to the new Central District.
