= Zarneh, Isfahan =

Village in Isfahan province, Iran

Zarneh Persian: زرنه
- Village
- Location within Iran
- Coordinates: 33°06′18″N 50°05′01″E
- Country: Iran
- Province: Isfahan
- County: Buin Miandasht
- District: Central
- Rural District: Yeylaq

Population (2016)
  - Total: 102
- Time zone: UTC+3:30 (IRST)

Zarneh (Persian: زرنه) (Note: Also known as Zarnā and Zūraznā; Armenian: Բոլորան, romanized as Boloran) is a village in Yeylaq Rural District of the Central District in Buin Miandasht County, Isfahan province, Iran.

Zarneh is part of a larger region known as Fereydan (Persian: فریدن, Georgian: ფერეიდანი, Armenian: Փերիա). The village was historically populated by Armenians brought to this part of Iran by Shah Abbas of the Safavid dynasty in 1603 and 1604, following the Nakhchivan deportations. As of the 2010s, many Armenians remained in this village.

== Demographics ==
=== Population ===
At the time of the 2006 National Census, the village's population was 61 in 23 households, when it was in the former Buin Miandasht District of Faridan County. The following census in 2011 counted 64 people in 25 households. The 2016 census measured the population of the village as 102 people in 35 households, by which time the district had been separated from the county in the establishment of Buin Miandasht County. The rural district was transferred to the new Central District.
