= Nowghan-e Olya =

Neighborhood in Isfahan province, Iran

Nowghan-e Olya Persian: نوغان عليا
- Neighborhood
- Location within Iran
- Coordinates: 33°11′02″N 50°04′18″E
- Country: Iran
- Province: Isfahan
- County: Buin Miandasht
- District: Karchambu
- Rural District: Karchambu-ye Shomali
- Village: Nowghan

Population (2011)
  - Total: 72
- Time zone: UTC+3:30 (IRST)

Nowghan-e Olya (Persian: نوغان عليا) (Note: Also romanized as Nowghān Olyā and Nowghān-e ‘Olyā; also known as Narghān and Nowghān-e Bālā) is a neighborhood in the village of Nowghan in Karchambu-ye Shomali Rural District of Karchambu District in Buin Miandasht County, Isfahan province, Iran.

== Demographics ==
=== Population ===
At the time of the 2006 National Census, Nowghan-e Olya's population was 91 in 28 households, when it was a village in the former Buin Miandasht District of Faridan County. The following census in 2011 counted 72 people in 26 households.

In 2013, the district was separated from the county in the establishment of Buin Miandasht County, and the rural district was transferred to the new Karchambu District. Nowghan-e Olya merged with Nowghan-e Sofla, which was renamed Nowghan.
