= Nowghan, Iran =

Village in Isfahan province, Iran

Nowghan Persian: نوغان
- Village
- Location within Iran
- Coordinates: 33°11′33″N 50°04′46″E
- Country: Iran
- Province: Isfahan
- County: Buin Miandasht
- District: Karchambu
- Rural District: Karchambu-ye Shomali

Population (2016)
  - Total: 195
- Time zone: UTC+3:30 (IRST)

Nowghan (Persian: نوغان) (Note: Formerly known as Nowghan-e Sofla (نوغان سفلي), also romanized as Nowghān Sofla and Nowghān-e Soflá; also known as Nowghān-e Pā’īn) is a village in Karchambu-ye Shomali Rural District of Karchambu District in Buin Miandasht County, Isfahan province, Iran, serving as the capital of the district.

== Demographics ==
=== Population ===
At the time of the 2006 census, the population was 217 in 51 households, when it was in the former Buin Miandasht District of Faridan County. The following census in 2011 counted 192 people in 61 households. The 2016 census measured the population of the village as 195 people in 70 households, by which time the district had been separated from the county in the establishment of Buin Miandasht County. Nowghan-e Sofla merged with the village of Nowghan-e Olya and was renamed Nowghan. The rural district was transferred to the new Karchambu District.
