= Karchambu =

Karchambu (Persian: كرچمبو) may refer to:

- Karchambu-e Jonubi Rural District
- Karchambu-e Shomali Rural District
