= Nowghan =

Nowghan (Persian: نوغان) may refer to:

- Nowghan-e Olya
- Nowghan-e Sofla
