= Ahmadabad, Buin Miandasht =

Village in Isfahan province, Iran

Ahmadabad Persian: احمداباد
- Village
- Location within Iran
- Coordinates: 33°11′46″N 50°15′58″E
- Country: Iran
- Province: Isfahan
- County: Buin Miandasht
- District: Central
- Rural District: Sardsir

Population (2016)
  - Total: 53
- Time zone: UTC+3:30 (IRST)

Ahmadabad (Persian: احمداباد) (Note: Also romanized as Aḩmadābād; also known as Aḩmadābād Shāh Velāyat, Shāh Valad, and Shāh Valāyat) is a village in Sardsir Rural District of the Central District in Buin Miandasht County, Isfahan province, Iran.

== Demographics ==
=== Population ===
At the time of the 2006 National Census, the village's population was 66 in 19 households, when it was in the former Buin Miandasht District of Faridan County. The following census in 2011 counted 53 people in 21 households. The 2016 census measured the population of the village as 53 people in 20 households, by which time the district had been separated from the county in the establishment of Buin Miandasht County. The rural district was transferred to the new Central District.
