= Dashkasan, Isfahan =

Village in Isfahan province, Iran

Dashkasan Persian: داشكسن
- Village
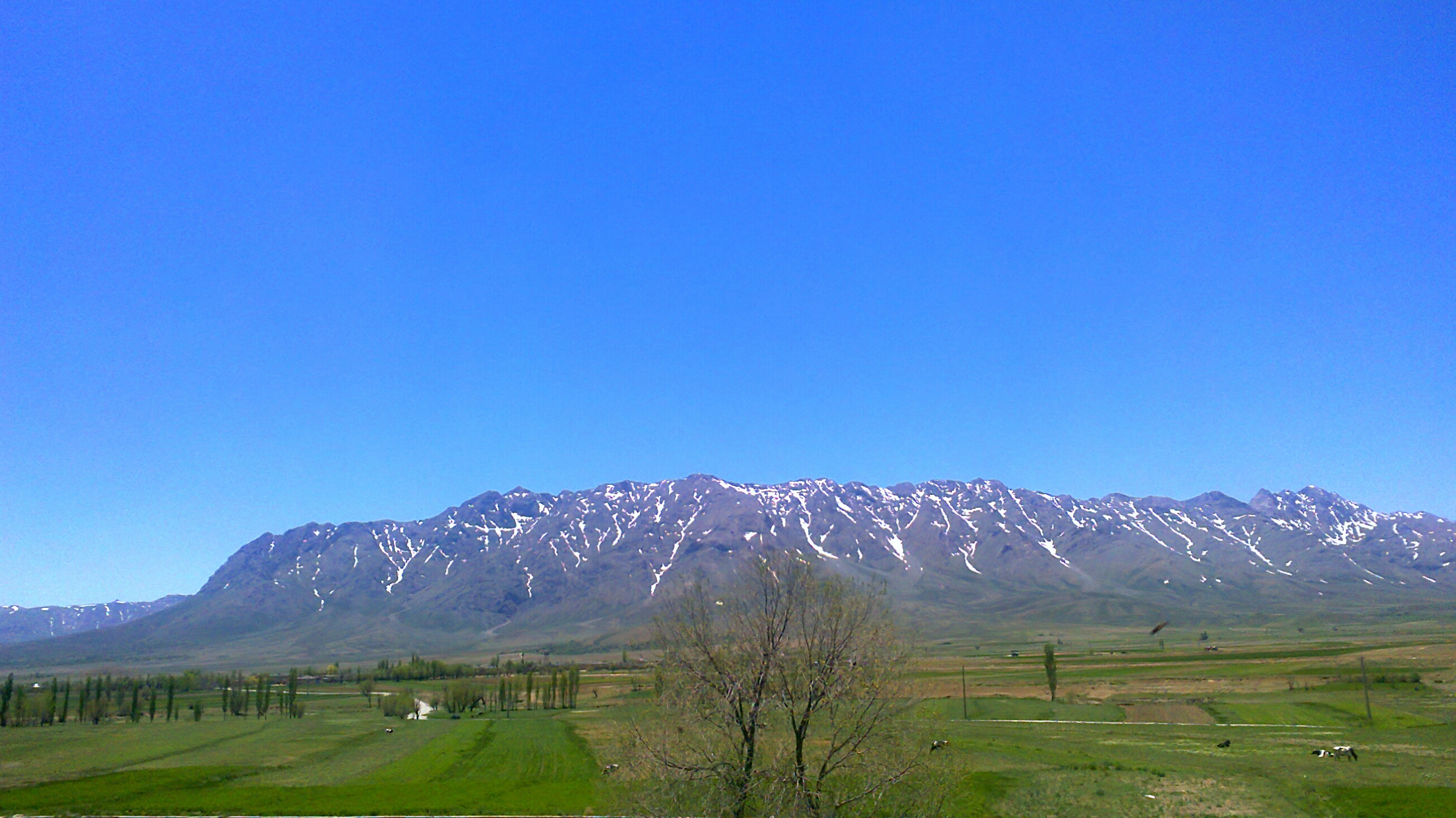
- Landscape near Dashkasan

- Location within Iran
- Coordinates: 33°02′18″N 50°10′03″E
- Country: Iran
- Province: Isfahan
- County: Buin Miandasht
- District: Central
- Rural District: Gorji

Population (2016)
  - Total: 473
- Time zone: UTC+3:30 (IRST)

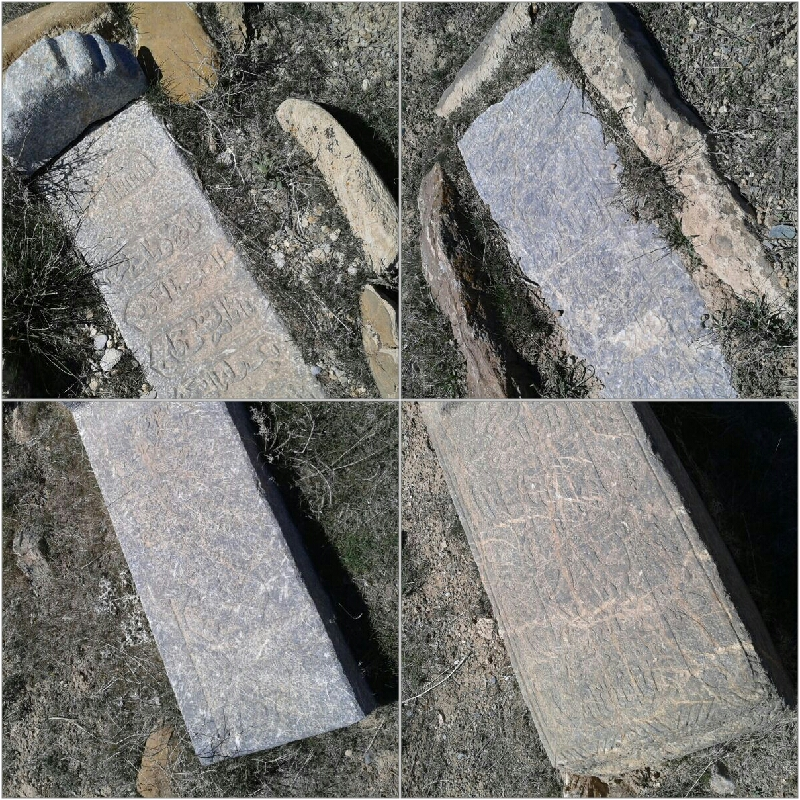
* Morteza Gholi Beyk, son of Ilchi Beyk, 1030 Hijri (1621)* Agha Baba Beyk, son of Morteza Gholi Beyk Gorji (Georgian)* Mohammad Bagher Beyk, son of Morteza Gholi Beyk Gorji (Georgian)

Dashkasan (Persian: داشكسن) (Note: Also romanized as Dāshkasan and Dāshkesan; also known as Dāshgesan) is a village in, and the capital of, Gorji Rural District in the Central District of Buin Miandasht County, Isfahan Province, Iran. The previous capital of the rural district was the village of Afus, now a city. Dashkasan is in the Zagros mountain range.

== Demographics ==
=== Language ===
The village has a population of ethnic Georgians (ფერეიდნელი). People from Dashkasan speak a Georgian dialect, along with Persian. The Georgian alphabet is also used.

=== Population ===
At the time of the 2006 National Census, the village's population was 606 in 125 households, when it was in the former Buin Miandasht District of Faridan County. The following census in 2011 counted 526 people in 145 households. The 2016 census measured the population of the village as 473 people in 142 households, by which time the district had been separated from the county in the establishment of Buin Miandasht County. The rural district was transferred to the new Central District. Dashkasan was the only village in its rural district with a recorded population.

== See also ==
- Georgians in Iran

== For further reading ==
- Muliani, S. (2001) Jaygah-e Gorjiha dar Tarikh va Farhang va Tamaddon-e Iran. Esfahan: Yekta [The Georgians’ position in the Iranian history and civilization].
