= Mahurestan-e Olya =

Village in Isfahan province, Iran

Hajji Fath Ali Persian: ماهورستان عليا
- Village
- Location within Iran
- Coordinates: 33°05′47″N 49°55′49″E
- Country: Iran
- Province: Isfahan
- County: Buin Miandasht
- District: Central
- Rural District: Yeylaq

Population (2016)
  - Total: 72
- Time zone: UTC+3:30 (IRST)

Mahurestan-e Olya (Persian: ماهورستان عليا) (Note: Also romanized as Māhūrestān-e ‘Olyā; also known as Māhūrestān-e Bālā and Mūrestān-e ‘Olyā) is a village in Yeylaq Rural District of the Central District in Buin Miandasht County, Isfahan province, Iran.

== Demographics ==
=== Population ===
At the time of the 2006 National Census, the village's population was 20 in four households, when it was in the former Buin Miandasht District of Faridan County. The following census in 2011 counted 89 people in 24 households. The 2016 census measured the population of the village as 72 people in 20 households, by which time the district had been separated from the county in the establishment of Buin Miandasht County. The rural district was transferred to the new Central District.
