= Mahurak =

Village in Isfahan province, Iran

Mahurak Persian: ماهورك
- Village
- Location within Iran
- Coordinates: 33°13′46″N 49°59′32″E
- Country: Iran
- Province: Isfahan
- County: Buin Miandasht
- District: Karchambu
- Rural District: Karchambu-ye Jonubi

Population (2016)
  - Total: 137
- Time zone: UTC+3:30 (IRST)

Mahurak (Persian: ماهورك) (Note: Also romanized as Māhūrak; also known as Māhūzak and Mūrak) is a village in Karchambu-ye Jonubi Rural District of Karchambu District in Buin Miandasht County, Isfahan province, Iran.

== Demographics ==
=== Population ===
At the time of the 2006 National Census, the village's population was 133 in 30 households, when it was in the former Buin Miandasht District of Faridan County. The following census in 2011 counted 95 people in 26 households. The 2016 census measured the population of the village as 137 people in 48 households, by which time the district had been separated from the county in the establishment of Buin Miandasht County. The rural district was transferred to the new Karchambu District.
