= Darbazi =

Architectural term

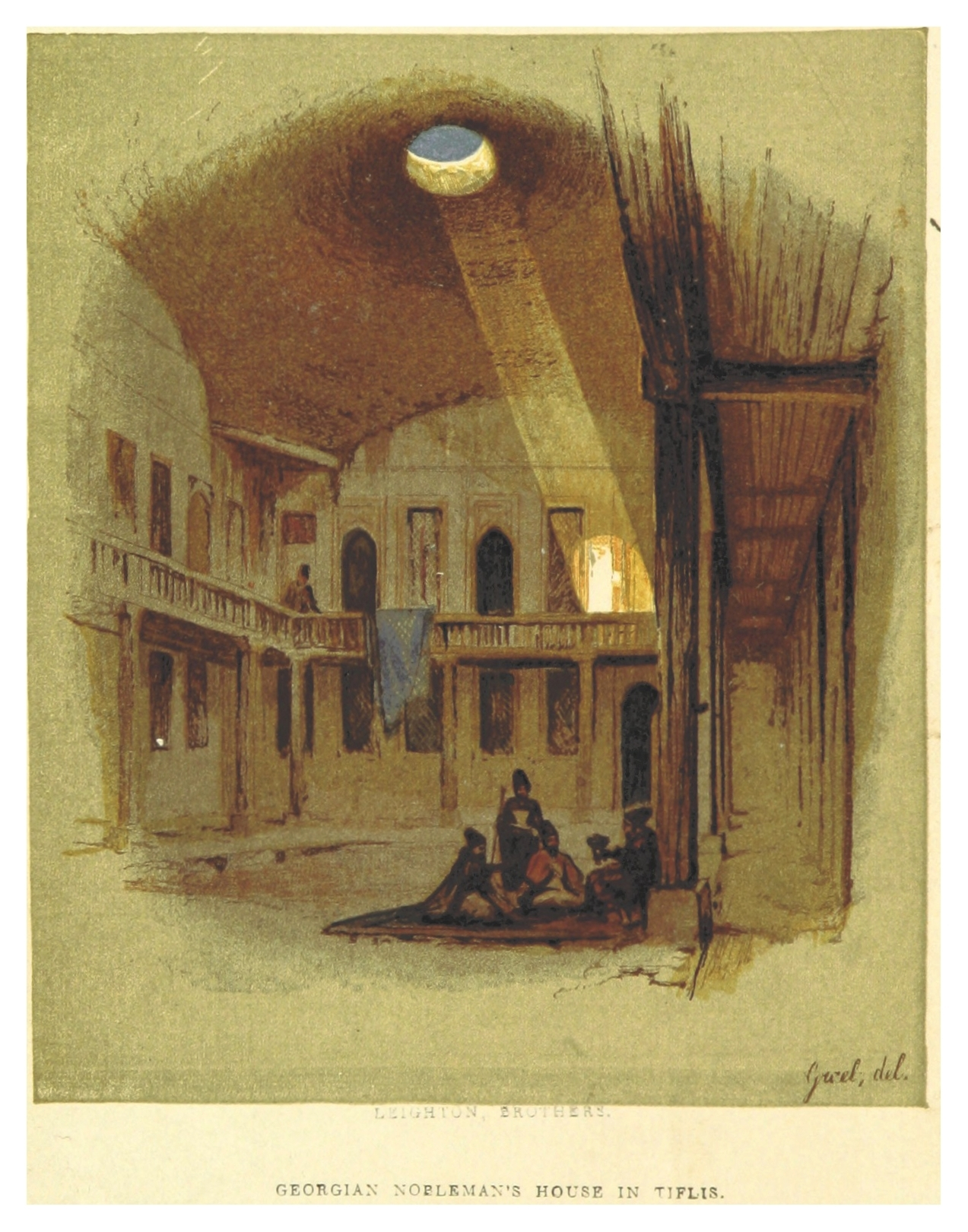
A Georgian nobleman's darbazi-type house in Tbilisi in the early 19th century.

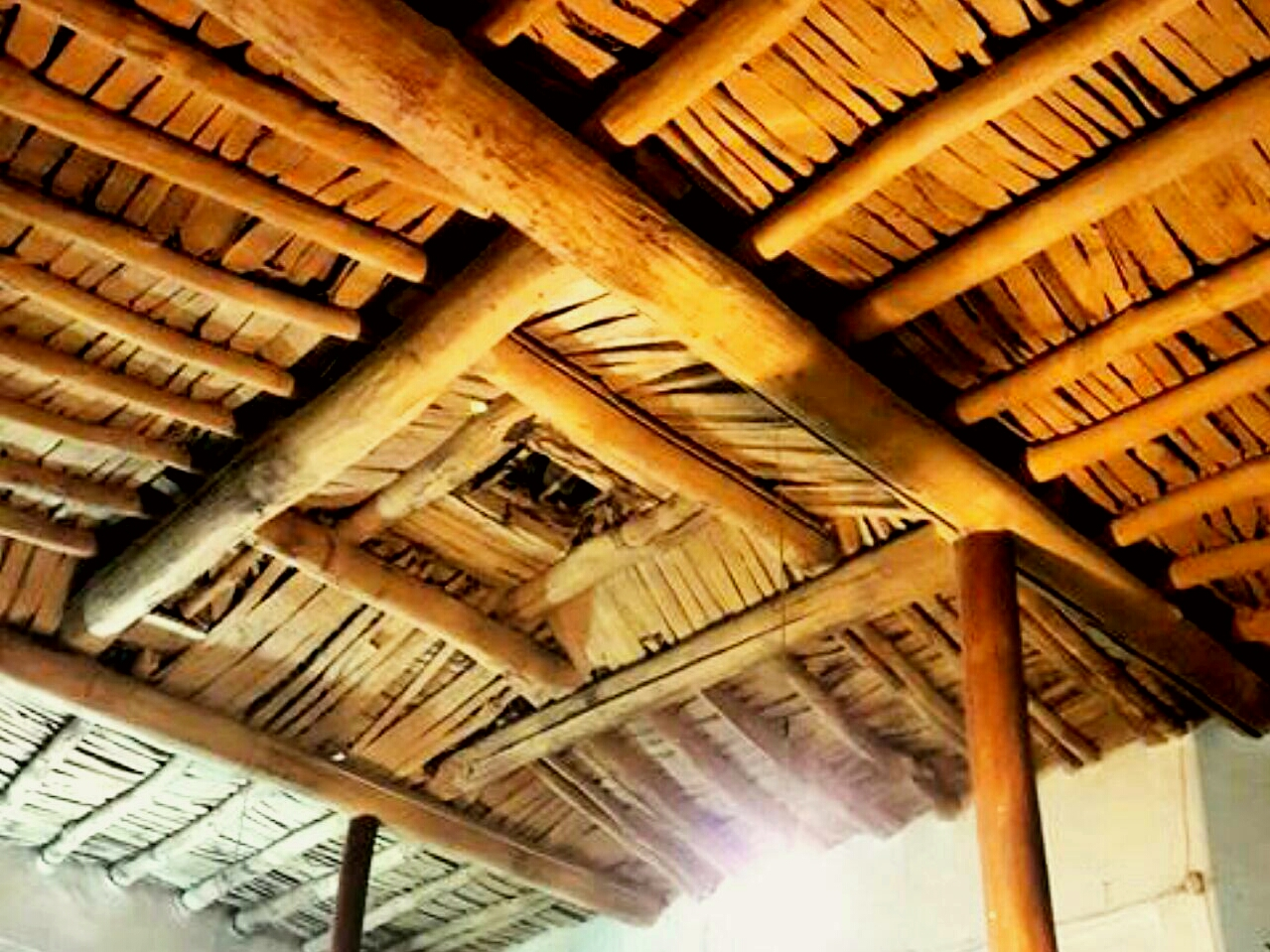
A surviving darbazi roof known as "Gorji poush" in Georgian village Dashkasan, Isfahan, Iran

Darbazi (Georgian: დარბაზი; from Persian: darvāze, "gate") is a term used in Georgia to describe a chamber with a distinctive "swallow dome"-type roof structure found in the traditional domestic architecture of Asia Minor and the South Caucasus. The central feature is a pyramidal vault (gvirgvini), supported on pillars and constructed of a stepped series of hewn logs and beams, with a central opening at the top which serves as a window and smoke flue. The Roman authority Vitruvius (1st century BC) includes in his De architectura a description of a Colchian dwelling, the ancient prototype of a darbazi. Such lantern roofs are called harazashen or glkhatun in Armenia, kirlangiç kubbe or kirlangiç ortu in Turkey, and karadam in Azerbaijan.

The darbazi house, with local variations, continued to be constructed into the 20th century in Georgia. It occurs extensively in the provinces of Kartli, Kakheti, and Samtskhe-Javakheti. These houses are often supported at its underground base by finely carved beams and pillars, in particular, the solid wooden upright known as the deda-bodzi ("mother-pillar") that takes the weight of the corbelled roofing. The darbazi form might have influenced the early Christian architecture of Georgia, for the ancient rotund and octagonal Christian structures—widespread in Italy, Syria, and elsewhere—never attained popularity in Georgia.

== Illustrations ==
- Darbazi in eastern Georgia (cross-section). The Great Soviet Encyclopedia. Retrieved on 2011-05-30.
- Gvirgvini. The Great Soviet Encyclopedia. Retrieved on 2011-05-30.
- Deda-Bodzi. The Great Soviet Encyclopedia. Retrieved on 2011-05-30.
