= Mahurestan =

Mahurestan (Persian: ماهورستان) may refer to:

- Mahurestan-e Olya, Isfahan Province
- Mahurestan, Markazi
