= Shah Valad =

Shah Valad (Persian: شاهولد) may refer to:

- Shah Valad, Isfahan
- Shah Valad, Lorestan
