= Qaleh Khvajeh, Isfahan =

Village in Isfahan province, Iran

Qaleh Khvajeh Persian: قلعه خواجه
- Village
- Location within Iran
- Coordinates: 33°06′52″N 50°00′33″E
- Country: Iran
- Province: Isfahan
- County: Buin Miandasht
- District: Central
- Rural District: Yeylaq

Population (2016)
  - Total: 33
- Time zone: UTC+3:30 (IRST)

Qaleh Khvajeh (Persian: قلعه خواجه) (Note: Also romanized as Qal‘eh Khvājeh and Qal‘eh-ye Khvājeh; also known as Ghal‘eh Khajeh) is a village in Yeylaq Rural District of the Central District in Buin Miandasht County, Isfahan province, Iran.

== Demographics ==
=== Population ===
At the time of the 2006 National Census, the village's population was 117 in 21 households, when it was in the former Buin Miandasht District of Faridan County. The following census in 2011 counted 46 people in 14 households. The 2016 census measured the population of the village as 33 people in 14 households, by which time the district had been separated from the county in the establishment of Buin Miandasht County. The rural district was transferred to the new Central District.
