= Murak =

Murak (Persian: مورك) may refer to:

- Murak, Isfahan
- Murak, Buin va Miandasht, Isfahan Province
- Murak, Vardasht, Isfahan Province
