= Yeylaq Rural District =

Yeylaq Rural District (Persian: دهستان ييلاق) may refer to:

- Yeylaq Rural District (Kaleybar County), East Azerbaijan province
- Yeylaq Rural District (Isfahan Province)
