= Afus =

City in Isfahan province, Iran

Afus Persian: افوس
- City
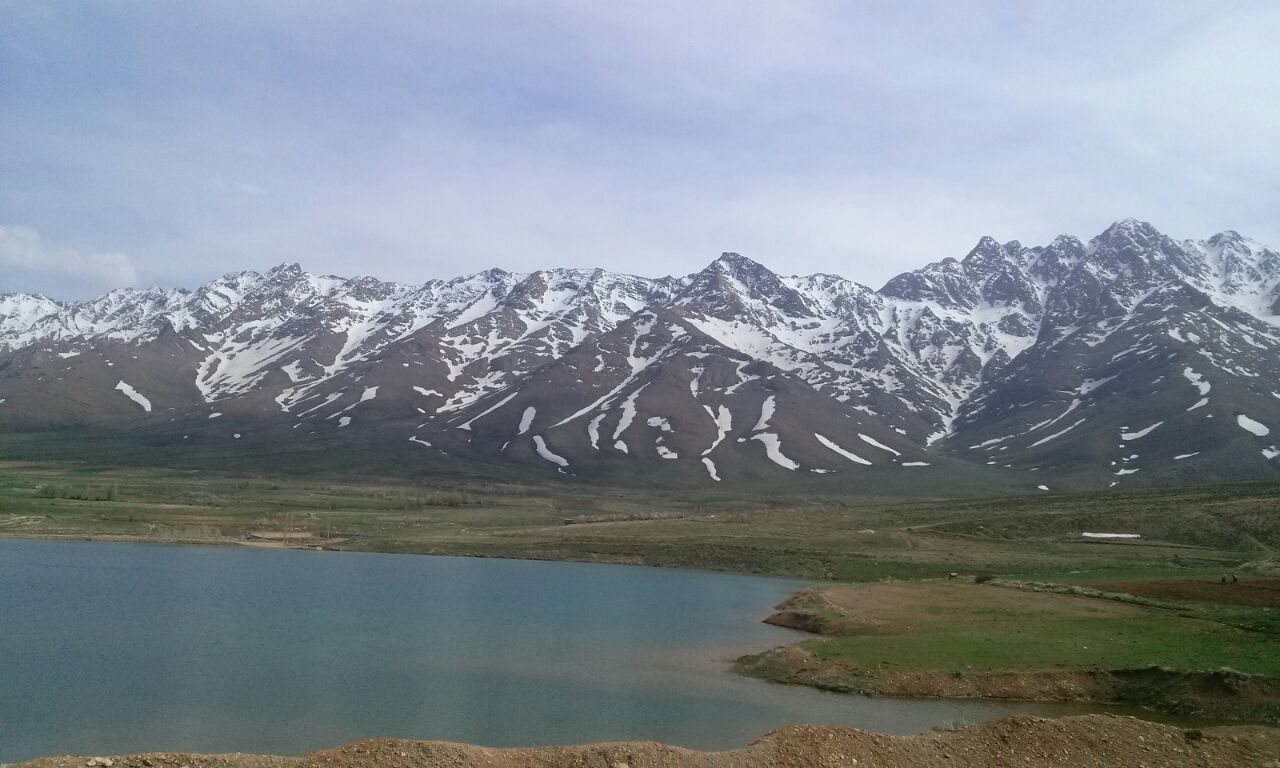
- Landscape near the city of Afus

- Location within Iran
- Coordinates: 33°01′23″N 50°05′33″E
- Country: Iran
- Province: Isfahan
- County: Buin Miandasht
- District: Central
- Established as a city: 1996

Population (2016)
  - Total: 3,696
- Time zone: UTC+3:30 (IRST)

Afus (Persian: افوس) (Note: Also romanized as Afūs; also known as Afūz and Aqdas) is a city in the Central District of Buin Miandasht County, Isfahan province, Iran. As a village, it served as the capital of Gorji Rural District until its capital was transferred to the village of Dashkasan. Afus was converted to a city in 1996.

== Demographics ==
=== Population ===
At the time of the 2006 National Census, the city's population was 3,805 in 1,045 households, when it was in the former Buin Miandasht District of Faridan County. The following census in 2011 counted 4,313 people in 1,243 households. The 2016 census measured the population of the city as 3,696 people in 1,258 households, by which time the district had been separated from the county in the establishment of Buin Miandasht County. Afus and the rural district were transferred to the new Central District.

== Gallery ==
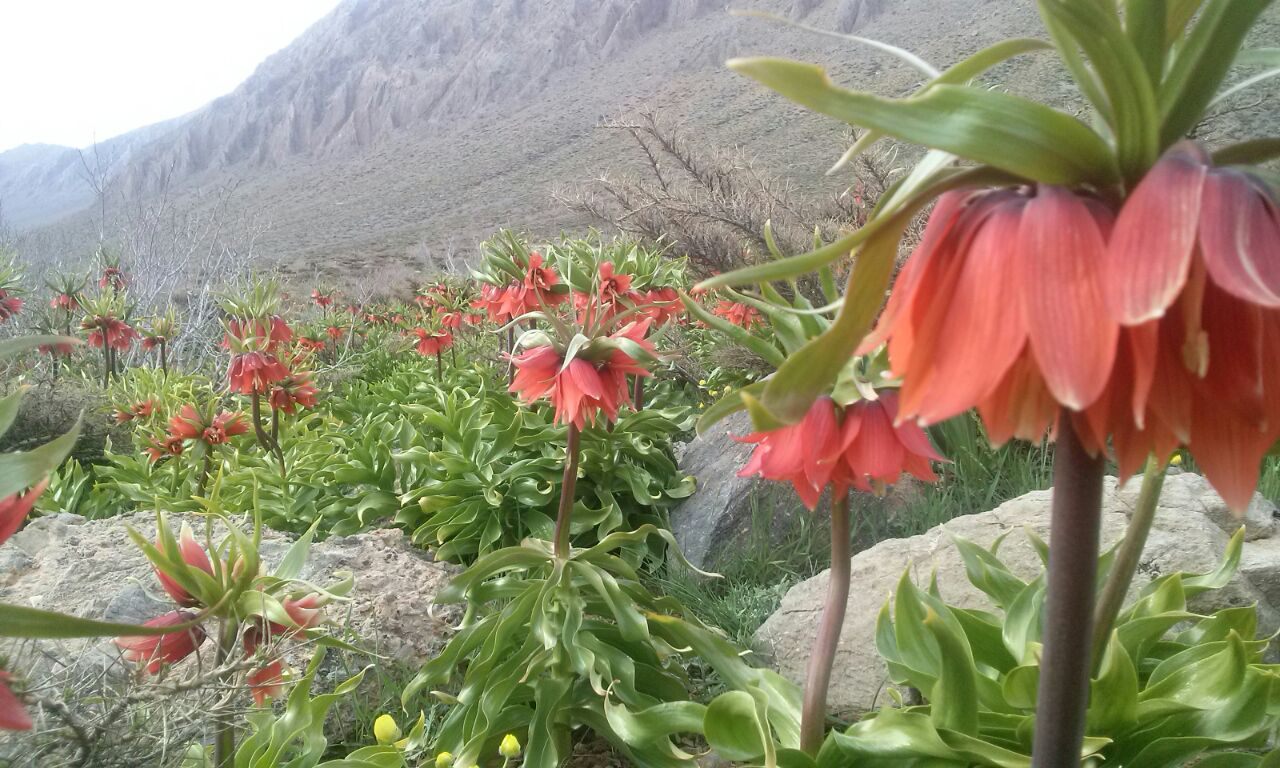

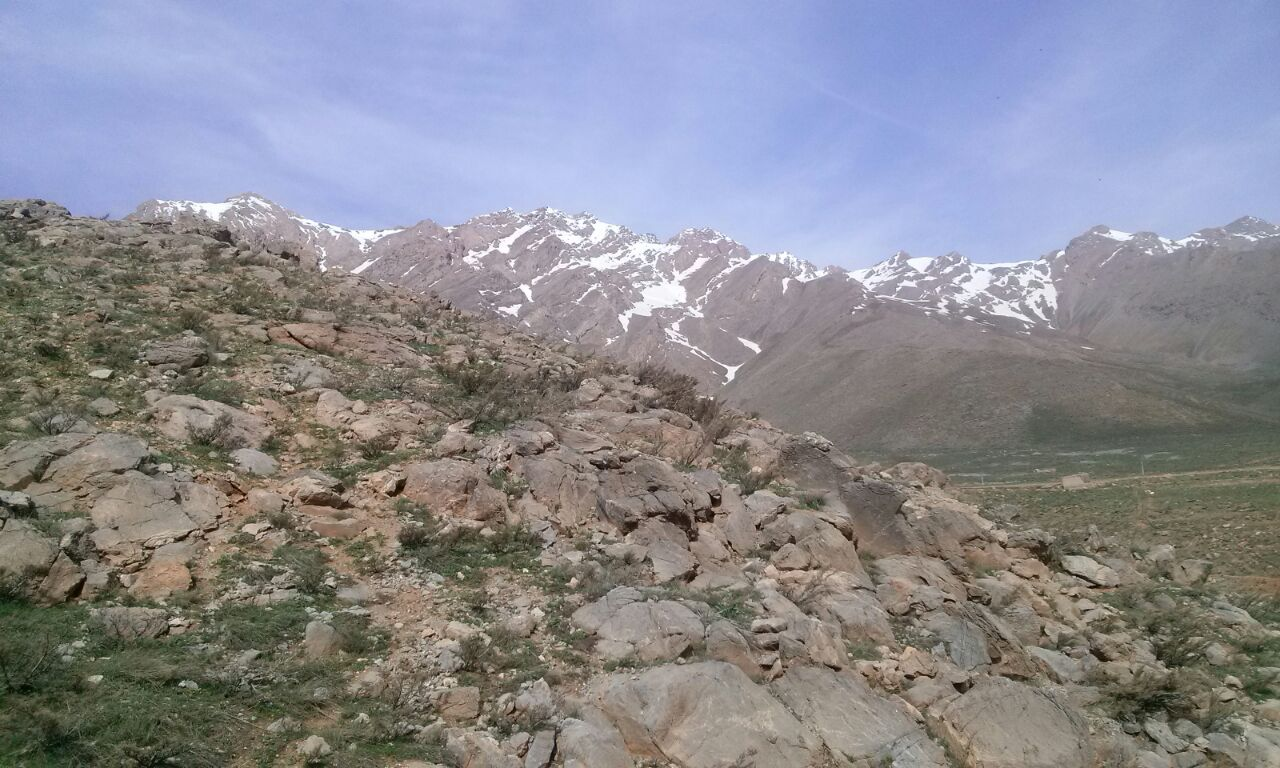

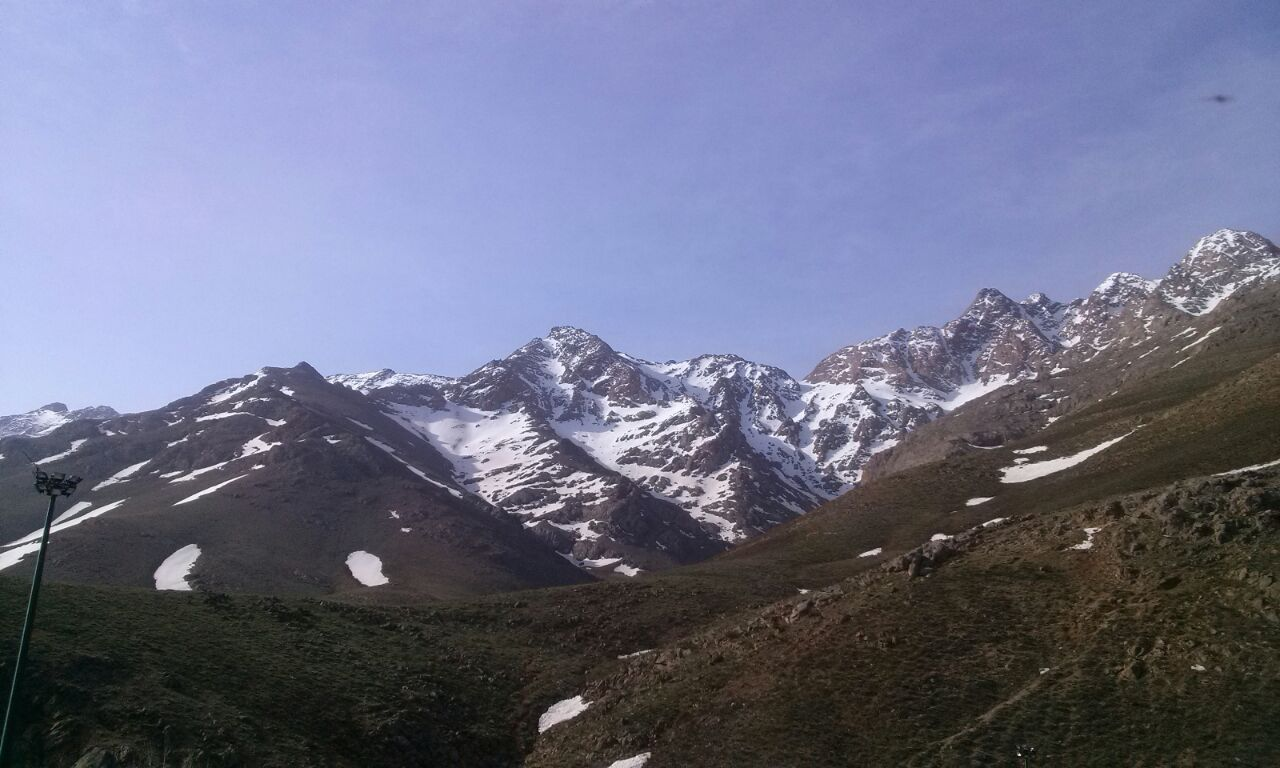

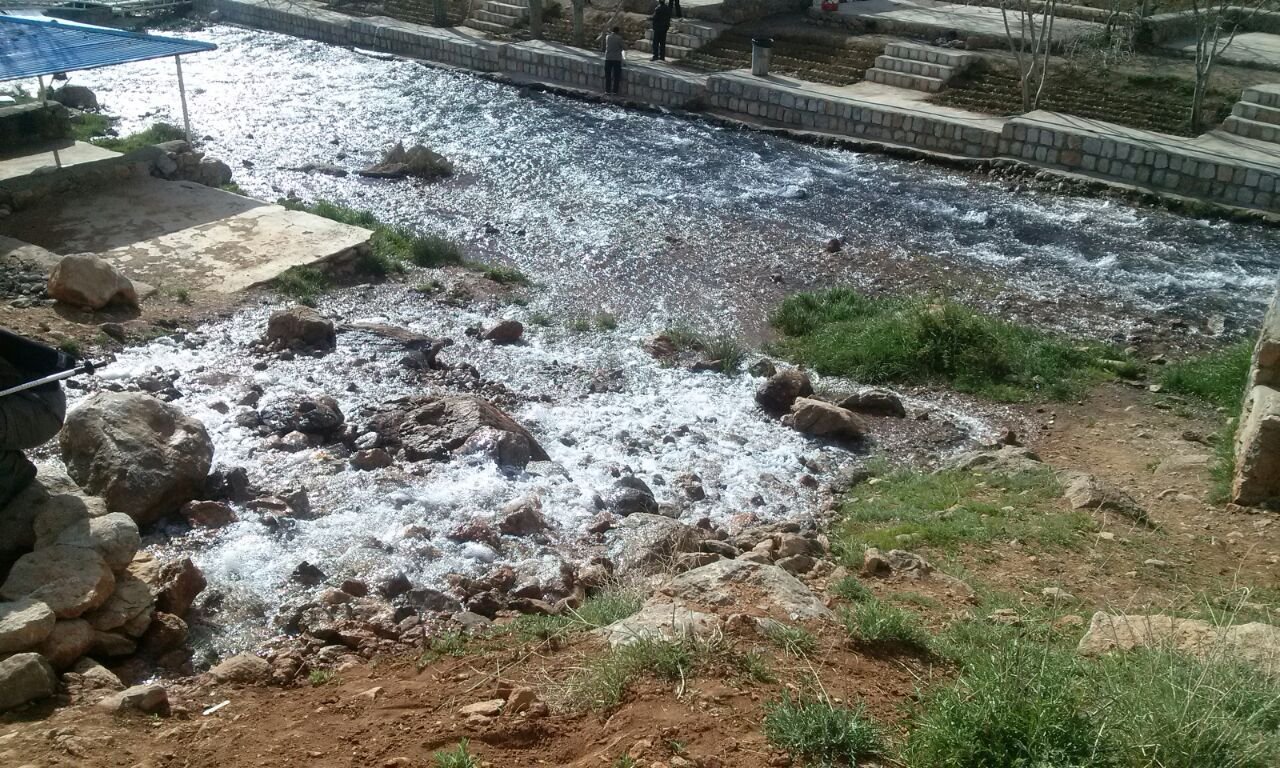
