= Sardsir Rural District =

Rural district in Isfahan province, Iran

Sardsir Rural District Persian: دهستان سردسير
- Rural District
- Location within Iran
- Coordinates: 33°09′N 50°14′E
- Country: Iran
- Province: Isfahan
- County: Buin Miandasht
- District: Central
- Established: 1987
- Capital: Qarah Boltaq

Population (2016)
  - Total: 2,753
- Time zone: UTC+3:30 (IRST)

Sardsir Rural District (Persian: دهستان سردسير) is in the Central District of Buin Miandasht County, Isfahan province, Iran. Its capital is the village of Qarah Boltaq.

== Demographics ==
=== Population ===
At the time of the 2006 National Census, the rural district's population (as a part of the former Buin Miandasht District in Faridan County) was 3,512 in 911 households. There were 2,838 inhabitants in 896 households at the following census of 2011. The 2016 census measured the population of the rural district as 2,753 in 996 households, by which time the district had been separated from the county in the establishment of Buin Miandasht County. The rural district was transferred to the new Central District. The most populous of its 14 villages was Qarah Boltaq, with 553 people.

=== Other villages in the rural district ===
- Ahmadabad
- Artijan
- Deh-e Rajab
- Hadan
- Hoseynabad
- Jowzar
- Khalili
- Marbar
- Masumabad
- Mirabad
