= Gorji Rural District =

Rural district in Isfahan province, Iran

Gorji Rural District Persian: دهستان گرجی
- Rural District
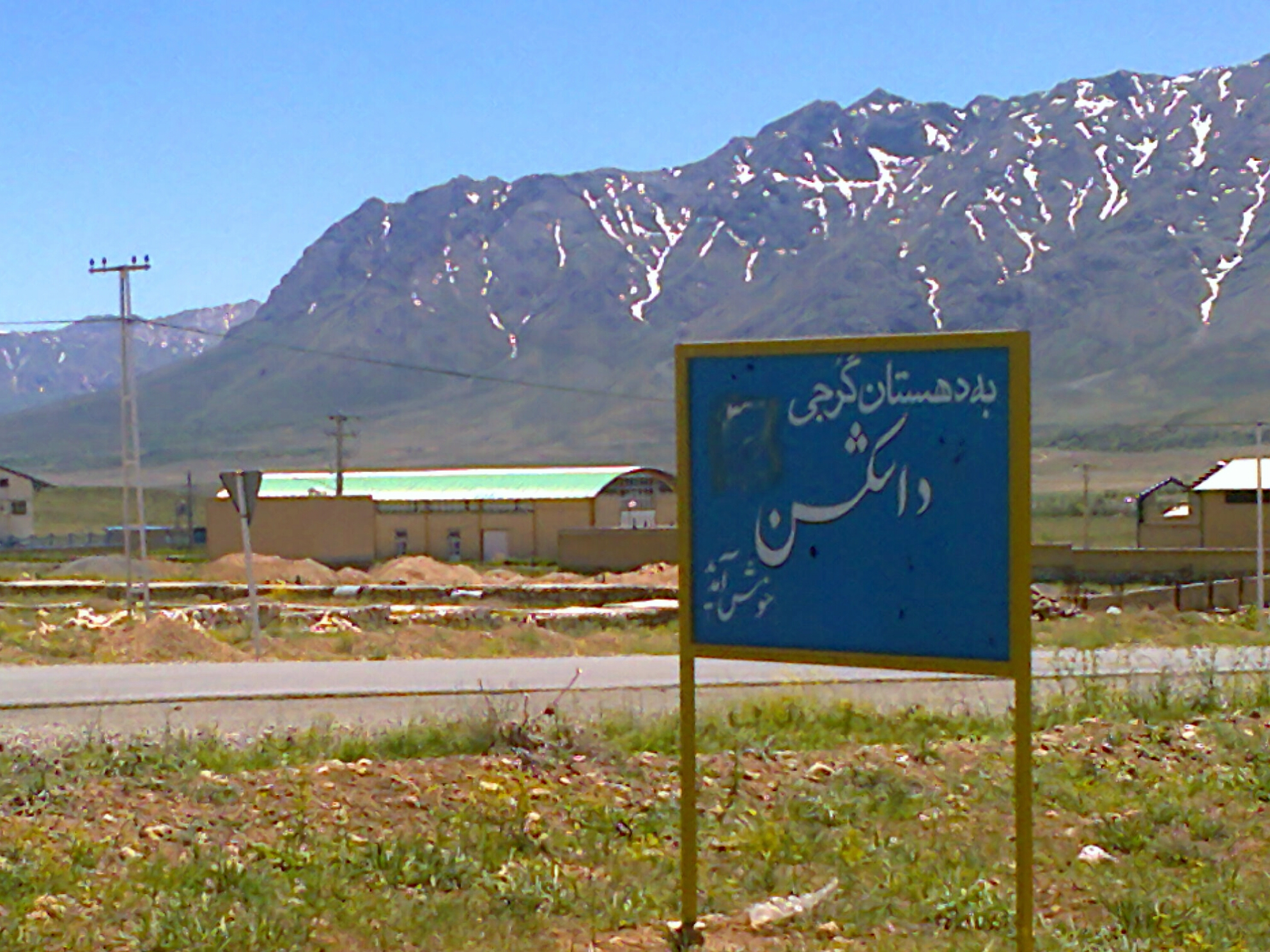
- Welcome sign to the village of Dashkasan

- Location within Iran
- Coordinates: 33°02′N 50°07′E
- Country: Iran
- Province: Isfahan
- County: Buin Miandasht
- District: Central
- Established: 1987
- Capital: Dashkasan

Population (2016)
  - Total: 473
- Time zone: UTC+3:30 (IRST)

Gorji Rural District (Persian: دهستان گرجی) is in the Central District of Buin Miandasht County, Isfahan province, Iran. Its capital is the village of Dashkasan. The previous capital of the rural district was the village of Afus, now a city.

== Demographics ==
=== Population ===
At the time of the 2006 National Census, the rural district's population (as a part of the former Buin Miandasht District of Faridan County) was 606 in 125 households. There were 526 inhabitants in 145 households at the following census of 2011. The 2016 census measured the population of the rural district as 473 in 142 households, by which time the district had been separated from the county in the establishment of Buin Miandasht County. The rural district was transferred to the new Central District. Of its eight villages, only Dashkasan reported a population, with 473 people.
