= Karchambu-ye Jonubi Rural District =

Rural district in Isfahan province, Iran

Karchambu-ye Jonubi Rural District Persian: دهستان كرچمبو جنوبی
- Rural District
- Location within Iran
- Coordinates: 33°11′N 49°58′E
- Country: Iran
- Province: Isfahan
- County: Buin Miandasht
- District: Karchambu
- Established: 1987
- Capital: Boltaq

Population (2016)
  - Total: 2,172
- Time zone: UTC+3:30 (IRST)

Karchambu-ye Jonubi Rural District (Persian: دهستان كرچمبو جنوبی) is in Karchambu District of Buin Miandasht County, Isfahan province, Iran. Its capital is the village of Boltaq.

== Demographics ==
=== Population ===
At the time of the 2006 National Census, the rural district's population (as a part of the former Buin Miandasht District in Faridan County) was 2,425 in 527 households. There were 2,019 inhabitants in 541 households at the following census of 2011. The 2016 census measured the population of the rural district as 2,172 in 701 households, by which time the district had been separated from the county in the establishment of Buin Miandasht County. The rural district was transferred to the new Karchambu District. The most populous of its eight villages was Boltaq, with 1,462 people.

=== Other villages in the rural district ===
- Bagh Madi
- Darreh Howz
- Darreh Sari
- Khalat Pushan
- Mahurak
- Qaleh Ekhlas
- Tir Kert
