= Buin Miandasht =

City in Isfahan province, Iran

Buin Miandasht Persian: بوئين مياندشت
- City
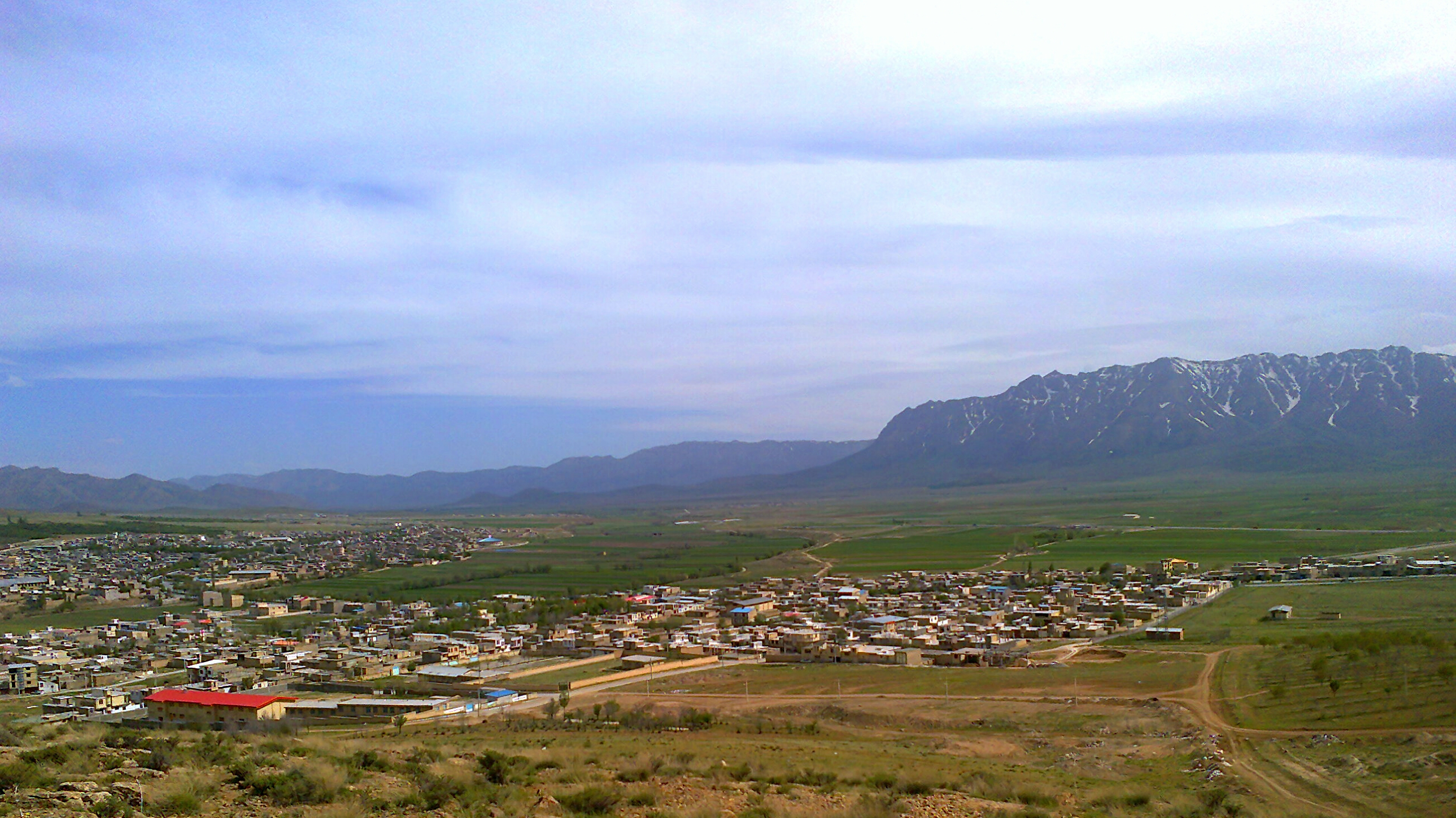
- The city of Buin Miandasht

- Location within Iran
- Coordinates: 33°04′33″N 50°09′47″E
- Country: Iran
- Province: Isfahan
- County: Buin Miandasht
- District: Central

Population (2016)
  - Total: 9,889
- Time zone: UTC+3:30 (IRST)

Buin Miandasht (Persian: بوئين مياندشت) (Note: Also romanized as Bu’in Miāndasht; also known as Bu’ino Miāndasht (English translation: Buin and Miandasht)) is a city in the Central District of Buin Miandasht County, Isfahan province, Iran, serving as capital of both the county and the district.

== Demographics ==
=== Ethnicity ===
The Miandasht neighborhood of the city is mainly populated by Iranian Georgians and is known in the Georgian language as Toreli. The city was a merger of two smaller settlements, Buin and Miandasht. Buin Miandasht includes the neighborhoods of Buin, Miandasht, and Sheshjavan, the latter a village until 1998.

=== Population ===
At the time of the 2006 National Census, the city's population was 9,933 in 2,537 households, when it was capital of the former Buin Miandasht District in Faridan County. The following census in 2011 counted 10,256 people in 2,905 households. The 2016 census measured the population of the city as 9,889 people in 3,137 households, by which time the district had been separated from the county in the establishment of Buin Miandasht County. Buin Miandasht was transferred to the new Central District as the county's capital.

== Gallery ==
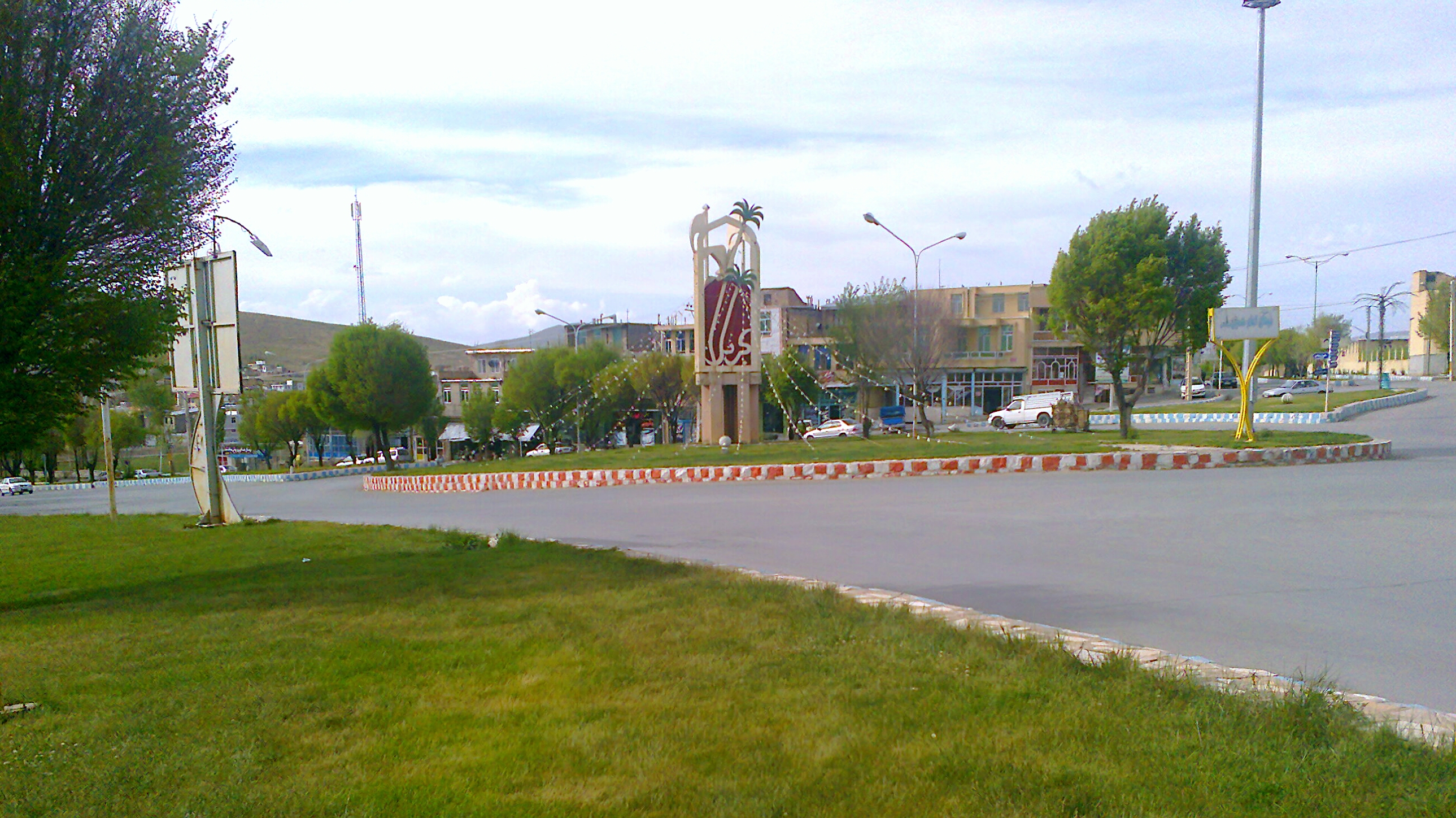

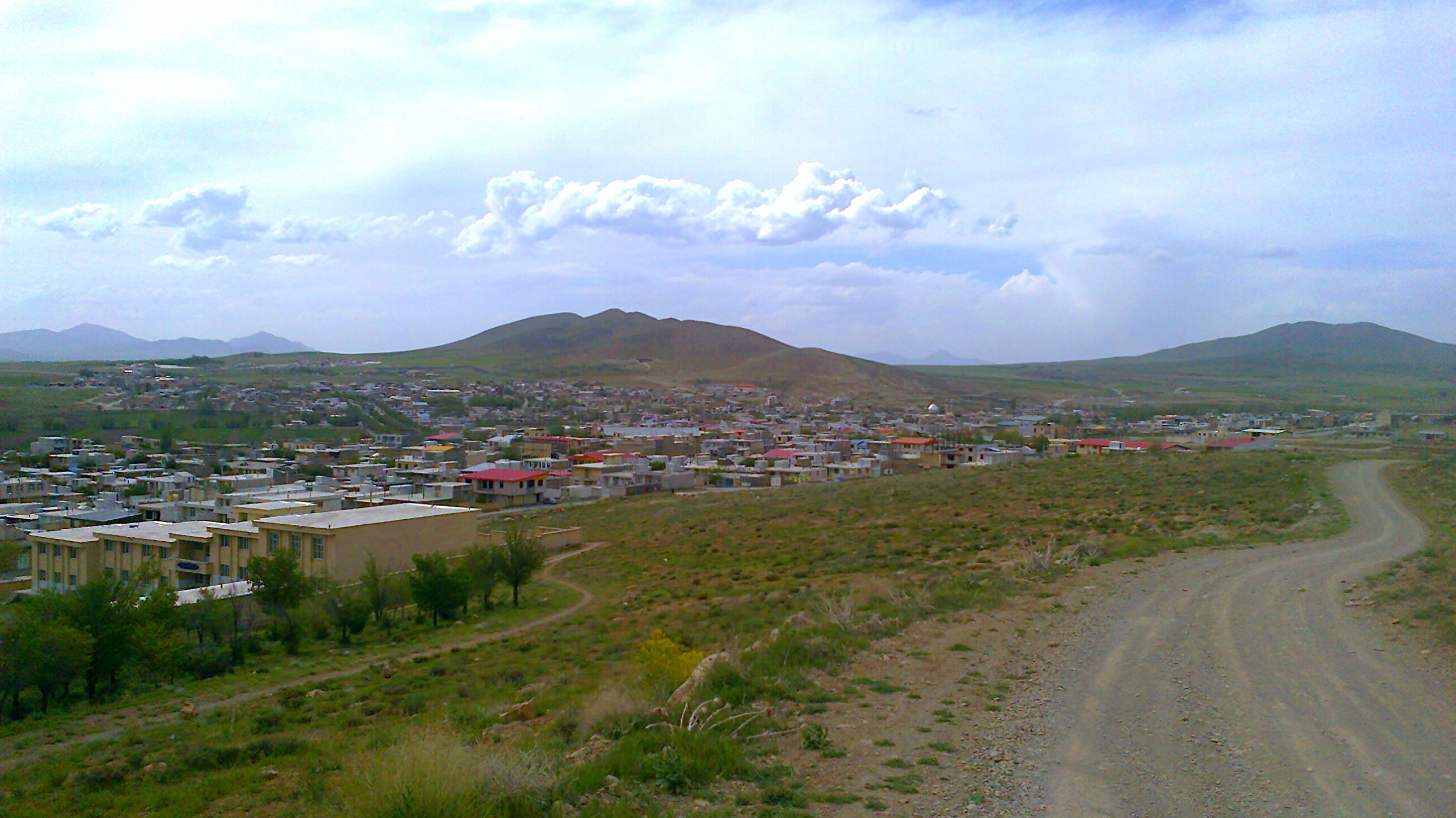
