= Yeylaq Rural District (Buin Miandasht County) =

Rural district in Isfahan province, Iran

Yeylaq Rural District Persian: دهستان ييلاق
- Rural District
- Location within Iran
- Coordinates: 33°06′N 50°02′E
- Country: Iran
- Province: Isfahan
- County: Buin Miandasht
- District: Central
- Established: 1991
- Capital: Aznavleh

Population (2016)
  - Total: 3,189
- Time zone: UTC+3:30 (IRST)

Yeylaq Rural District (Persian: دهستان ييلاق) is in the Central District of Buin Miandasht County, Isfahan province, Iran. Its capital is the village of Aznavleh.

== Demographics ==
=== Population ===
At the time of the 2006 National Census, the rural district's population (as a part of the former Buin Miandasht District in Faridan County) was 4,012 in 787 households. There were 3,739 inhabitants in 1,048 households at the following census of 2011. The 2016 census measured the population of the rural district as 3,189 in 1,060 households, by which time the district had been separated from the county in the establishment of Buin Miandasht County. The rural district was transferred to the new Central District. The most populous of its 16 villages was Aghcheh, with 934 people.

=== Other villages in the rural district ===
- Aqa Gol
- Hajji Fath Ali
- Hezar Jarib
- Mahurestan-e Olya
- Moghandar
- Qaemabad
- Qaleh Khvajeh
- Tang-e Bid
- Zarneh
