= Qaleh-ye Khvajeh, Fars =

Qaleh-ye Khvajeh قلعه خواجه
- Village
- Location within Iran
- Coordinates: 29°10′39″N 54°19′47″E
- Country: Iran
- Province: Fars
- County: Neyriz
- Bakhsh: Central
- Rural District: Rostaq

Population (2006)
  - Total: 238
- Time zone: UTC+3:30 (IRST)
  - Summer (DST): UTC+4:30 (IRDT)

Qaleh-ye Khvajeh (Persian: قلعه خواجه, also Romanized as Qal‘eh-ye Khvājeh; also known as Khvājeh and Qal‘eh Khvājeh’ī) is a village in Rostaq Rural District, in the Central District of Neyriz County, Fars province, Iran. At the 2006 census, its population was 238, in 58 families.
