= Qaleh Khvajeh, Tehran =

Village in Tehran province, Iran

Qaleh Khvajeh Persian: قلعه خواجه
- Village
- Location within Iran
- Coordinates: 35°15′53″N 51°39′35″E
- Country: Iran
- Province: Tehran
- County: Varamin
- District: Javadabad
- Rural District: Behnamarab-e Jonubi

Population (2016)
  - Total: 1,156
- Time zone: UTC+3:30 (IRST)

Qaleh Khvajeh (Persian: قلعه خواجه) (Note: Also romanized as Qal‘eh Khavājeh and Qal‘eh-ye Khvājeh; also known as Qal‘eh Khājeh, Qal‘eh Khwāja and Qal‘eh-ye Khvājū) is a village in Behnamarab-e Jonubi Rural District of Javadabad District in Varamin County, Tehran province, Iran.

== Demographics ==
=== Population ===
At the time of the 2006 National Census, the village's population was 1,418 in 316 households. The following census in 2011 counted 1,329 people in 343 households. The 2016 census measured the population of the village as 1,156 people in 313 households.
