= Karchambu-ye Shomali Rural District =

Rural district in Isfahan province, Iran

Karchambu-ye Shomali Rural District Persian: دهستان كرچمبو شمالی
- Rural District
- Location within Iran
- Coordinates: 33°14′N 50°06′E
- Country: Iran
- Province: Isfahan
- County: Buin Miandasht
- District: Karchambu
- Established: 1987
- Capital: Kerch

Population (2016)
  - Total: 1,991
- Time zone: UTC+3:30 (IRST)

Karchambu-ye Shomali Rural District (Persian: دهستان كرچمبو شمالی) is in Karchambu District of Buin Miandasht County, Isfahan province, Iran. Its capital is the village of Kerch.

== Demographics ==
=== Population ===
At the time of the 2006 National Census, the rural district's population (as a part of the former Buin Miandasht District in Faridan County) was 3,293 in 734 households. There were 2,446 inhabitants in 754 households at the following census of 2011. The 2016 census measured the population of the rural district as 1,991 in 732 households, by which time the district had been separated from the county in the establishment of Buin Miandasht County. The rural district was transferred to the new Karchambu District. The most populous of its 10 villages was Hendukosh, with 598 people.

=== Other villages in the rural district ===
- Basinan
- Betlijeh
- Darreh Sukhteh
- Helaghareh
- Qaleh Bahman
- Tokhmaqlu
