= Karchambu District =

District in Isfahan province, Iran

Karchambu District Persian: بخش کرچمبو
- District
- Location within Iran
- Coordinates: 33°14′N 50°04′E
- Country: Iran
- Province: Isfahan
- County: Buin Miandasht
- Established: 2013
- Capital: Nowghan

Population (2016)
  - Total: 4,163
- Time zone: UTC+3:30 (IRST)

Karchambu District (Persian: بخش کرچمبو) is in Buin Miandasht County, Isfahan province, Iran. Its capital is the village of Nowghan.

== History ==
In 2013, Buin Miandasht District was separated from Faridan County in the establishment of Buin Miandasht County, which was divided into two districts and five rural districts, with the city of Buin Miandasht as its capital.

== Demographics ==
=== Population ===
At the time of the 2016 National Census, the district's population was 4,163 inhabitants in 1,433 households.

=== Administrative divisions ===
Karchambu District Population
Administrative Divisions	2016
Karchambu-ye Jonubi RD	2,172
Karchambu-ye Shomali RD	1,991
Total	4,163
RD = Rural District
