= Central District (Buin Miandasht County) =

District in Isfahan province, Iran

Central District (Buin Miandasht County) Persian: بخش مرکزی شهرستان بوئين مياندشت
- District
- Location within Iran
- Coordinates: 33°06′N 50°07′E
- Country: Iran
- Province: Isfahan
- County: Buin Miandasht
- Established: 2013
- Capital: Buin Miandasht

Population (2016)
  - Total: 20,000
- Time zone: UTC+3:30 (IRST)

The Central District of Buin Miandasht County (Persian: بخش مرکزی شهرستان بوئين مياندشت) is in Isfahan province, Iran. Its capital is the city of Buin Miandasht.

== History ==
In 2013, Buin Miandasht District was separated from Faridan County in the establishment of Buin Miandasht County, which was divided into two districts and five rural districts, with Buin Miandasht as its capital.

== Demographics ==
=== Population ===
At the time of the 2016 National Census, the district's population was 20,000 inhabitants in 6,593 households.

=== Administrative divisions ===
Central District (Buin Miandasht County) Population
Administrative Divisions	2016
Gorji RD	473
Sardsir RD	2,753
Yeylaq RD	3,189
Afus (city)	3,696
Buin Miandasht (city)	9,889
Total	20,000
RD = Rural District
