= Buin Miandasht County =

County in Isfahan province, Iran

Buin Miandasht County Persian: شهرستان بوئین میاندشت
- County
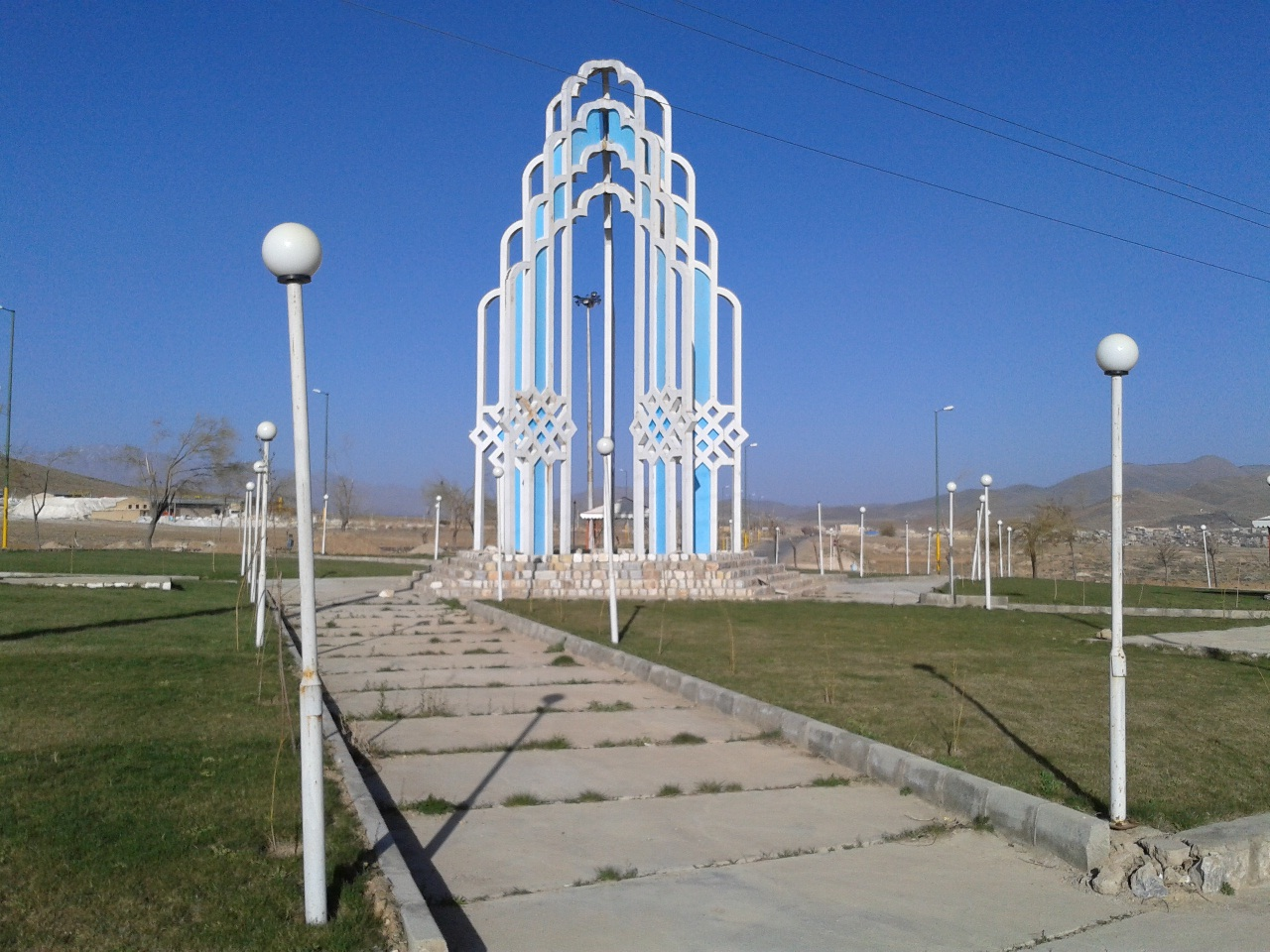
- Monument installed at the Western entrance of the county

- Location of Buin Miandasht County in Isfahan province (left, yellow)

- Location of Isfahan province in Iran
- Coordinates: 33°10′N 50°07′E
- Country: Iran
- Province: Isfahan
- Established: 2013
- Capital: Buin Miandasht
- Districts: Central, Karchambu

Population (2016)
  - Total: 24,163
- Time zone: UTC+3:30 (IRST)

Buin Miandasht County (Persian: شهرستان بوئین میاندشت) is in Isfahan province, Iran. Its capital is the city of Buin Miandasht.

== History ==
In 2013, Buin Miandasht District was separated from Faridan County in the establishment of Buin Miandasht County, which was divided into two districts and five rural districts, with Buin Miandasht as its capital.

== Demographics ==
=== Population ===
At the time of the 2016 National Census, the county's population was 24,163 in 8,026 households.

=== Administrative divisions ===
Buin Miandasht County's population and administrative structure are shown in the following table.

Buin Miandasht County Population
Administrative Divisions	2016
Central District	20,000
Gorji RD	473
Sardsir RD	2,753
Yeylaq RD	3,189
Afus (city)	3,696
Buin Miandasht (city)	9,889
Karchambu District	4,163
Karchambu-ye Jonubi RD	2,172
Karchambu-ye Shomali RD	1,991
Total	24,163
RD = Rural District

== See also ==
Media related to Buin va Miandasht County at Wikimedia Commons
