= Buin Miandasht District =

Former district in Isfahan province, Iran

Buin Miandasht District Persian: بخش بوئین میاندشت
- Former District
- Location within Iran
- Coordinates: 33°10′N 50°07′E
- Country: Iran
- Province: Isfahan
- County: Faridan
- Capital: Buin Miandasht

Population (2011)
  - Total: 26,137
- Time zone: UTC+3:30 (IRST)

Buin Miandasht District (Persian: بخش بوئین میاندشت) is a former administrative division of Faridan County, Isfahan province, Iran. Its capital was the city of Buin Miandasht.

== History ==
In 2013, the district was separated from the county in the establishment of Buin Miandasht County.

== Demographics ==
=== Population ===
At the time of the 2006 National Census, the district's population was 27,586 in 6,666 households. The following census in 2011 counted 26,137 people in 7,532 households.

=== Administrative divisions ===
Buin Miandasht District Population
Administrative Divisions	2006	2011
Gorji RD	606	526
Karchambu-ye Jonubi RD	2,425	2,019
Karchambu-ye Shomali RD	3,293	2,446
Sardsir RD	3,512	2,838
Yeylaq RD	4,012	3,739
Afus (city)	3,805	4,313
Buin Miandasht (city)	9,933	10,256
Total	27,586	26,137
RD = Rural District
