= Nshan Topouzian =

Armenian Apostolic clergyman (1966-2010)

Nshan Ara Garabed Topouzian (Western Armenian Նշան Թօփուզեան, Persian نشان توپوزیان) or Nshan Ara Karapet Topuzian (traditional Eastern Armenian Նշան Թոփուզեան, in reformed orthography Նշան Թոփուզյան (April 2, 1966, Shtaura, Beqaa Valley, Lebanon - April 27, 2010, Yerevan, Armenia) was an Armenian Apostolic clergyman. From August 2002 to April 2010 he was Prelate of the Armenian Diocese of Atrpatakan in Tabriz (Iran), under the jurisdiction of the Holy See of Cilicia.

== Biography ==
He was born Ara Topouzian in the village of Shtaura in the Beqaa Valley of Lebanon on April 2, 1966. He went to the Armenian primary school of Zahlé, and at the age of 12 he entered the Theological Seminary of the Holy See of Cilicia in Antelias. After completing the 5-year Jarankavorats (high school) program, he became a deacon in 1984. After finishing the Undzayaran (college) program, he was ordained a celibate priest and given the name Nshan by Catholicos Karekin I Sarkissian in 1987. In February 1991 he was sent as a visiting priest to the Diocese of Atrpatakan (Tabriz, Iran) and appointed Pontifical Legate by Karekin I in May 1991. He was elected Prelate of the Diocese of Atrpatakan in August 2002 and received the rank of Bishop from Catholicos Aram I on June 4, 2006.

During his tenure as Prelate, the four Armenian churches of Tabriz – Saint Mary Church (Surp Mariam), Saint Sarkis Church (Surp Sarkis), Saint Mary Church of Maralan (Maryam Nanna or Na-Na) and Shoghakat Church – and the Prelacy were renovated and a new church was built in Urmia. The Ararat Cultural Complex of Tabriz was built at Valman Street (opposite to the Presbyterian Church of Tabriz) close to South Shariati Street and Baron Avak neighborhood with the Armenian Saint Sarkis Church of Tabriz. Thanks to the efforts of Bishop Nshan Topouzian and other Armenian priests, in cooperation with the Iranian government, three ancient church complexes of the Armenian Diocese of Atrpatakan were added to UNESCO's World Heritage List on July 8, 2008, under the name Armenian Monastic Ensembles of Iran: the Monastery of Saint Thaddeus, the Monastery of Saint Stepanos and the Chapel of Dzordzor.

He visited the Arax river several times near Jolfa, where he observed the destruction of the ancient Armenian cemetery in Julfa in the Republic of Azerbaijan on the opposite bank of the river by Azerbaijani soldiers between 1997 and 2006. Together with other Armenian clergymen and Iranian experts of architecture, he photographed and filmed the soldiers when they were destroying the khachkars and gravestones. He wrote several articles for the Tehran newspaper Alik, where his photographs were shown to a broader public.

== Languages ==
Besides his native Western Armenian and Arabic, Bishop Nshan was also fluent in Eastern Armenian, Persian and Azerbaijani.

== Death and funeral ==
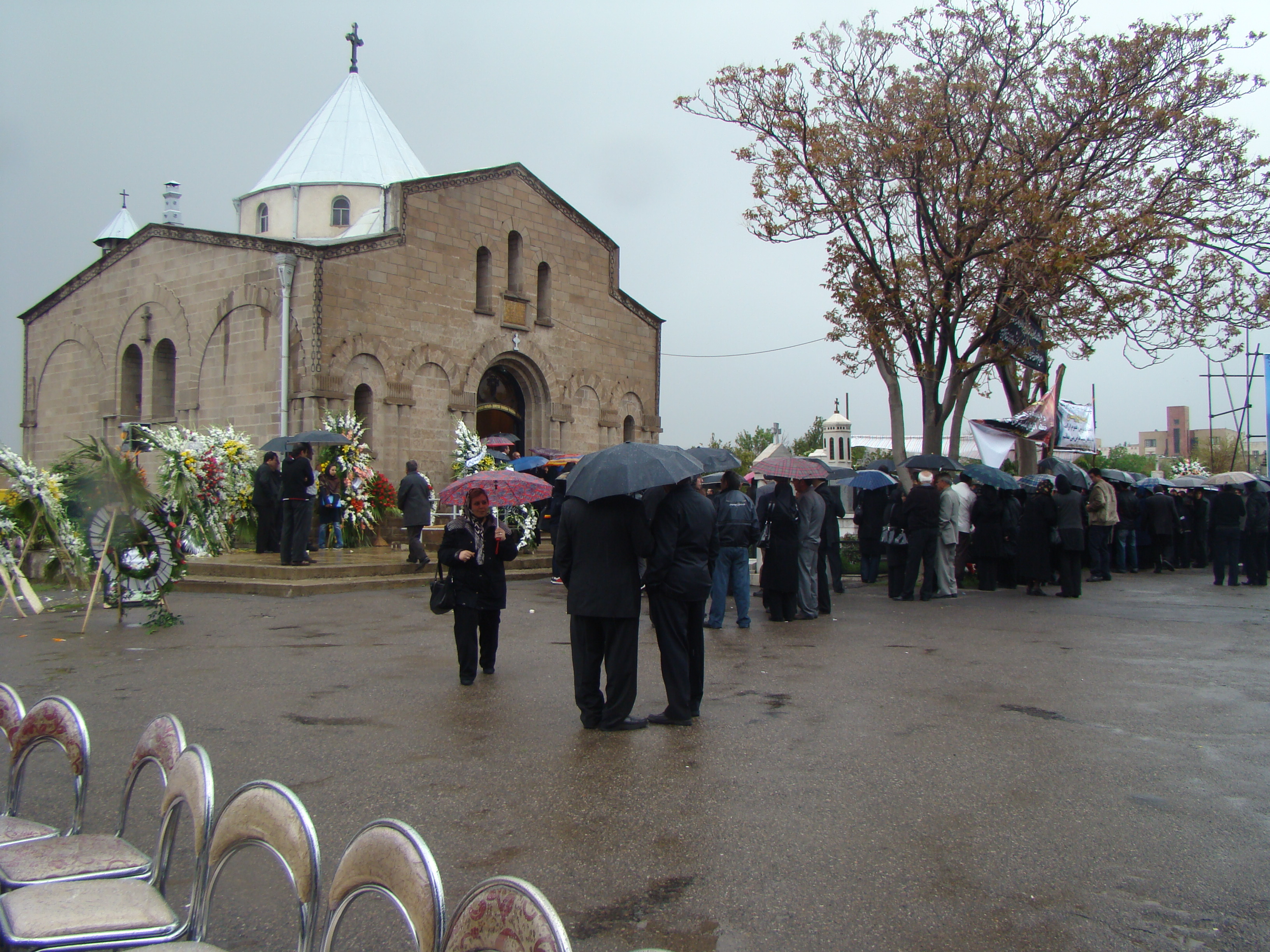
Burial of Nshan Topouzian at Shoghakat Church in Tabriz, 5 May 2010

In 2010 he fell sick with hepatocellular carcinoma and was admitted to treatment in the Nork-Marash Medical Center of Yerevan at the beginning of April 2010, but died on 27 April 2010, at the age of 44. On May 2, 2010, the Extreme Unction service was held at Surp Hakob Church in Kanaker (Armenia) by Bishop Ararat Kaltakjian of Etchmiadzin, Archbishop Sepuh Sargsyan of Tehran and Bishop Papken Tcharian of Isfahan. He was buried at the Armenian cemetery next to Shoghakat Church of Tabriz on 5 May 2010.
