= Lilava =

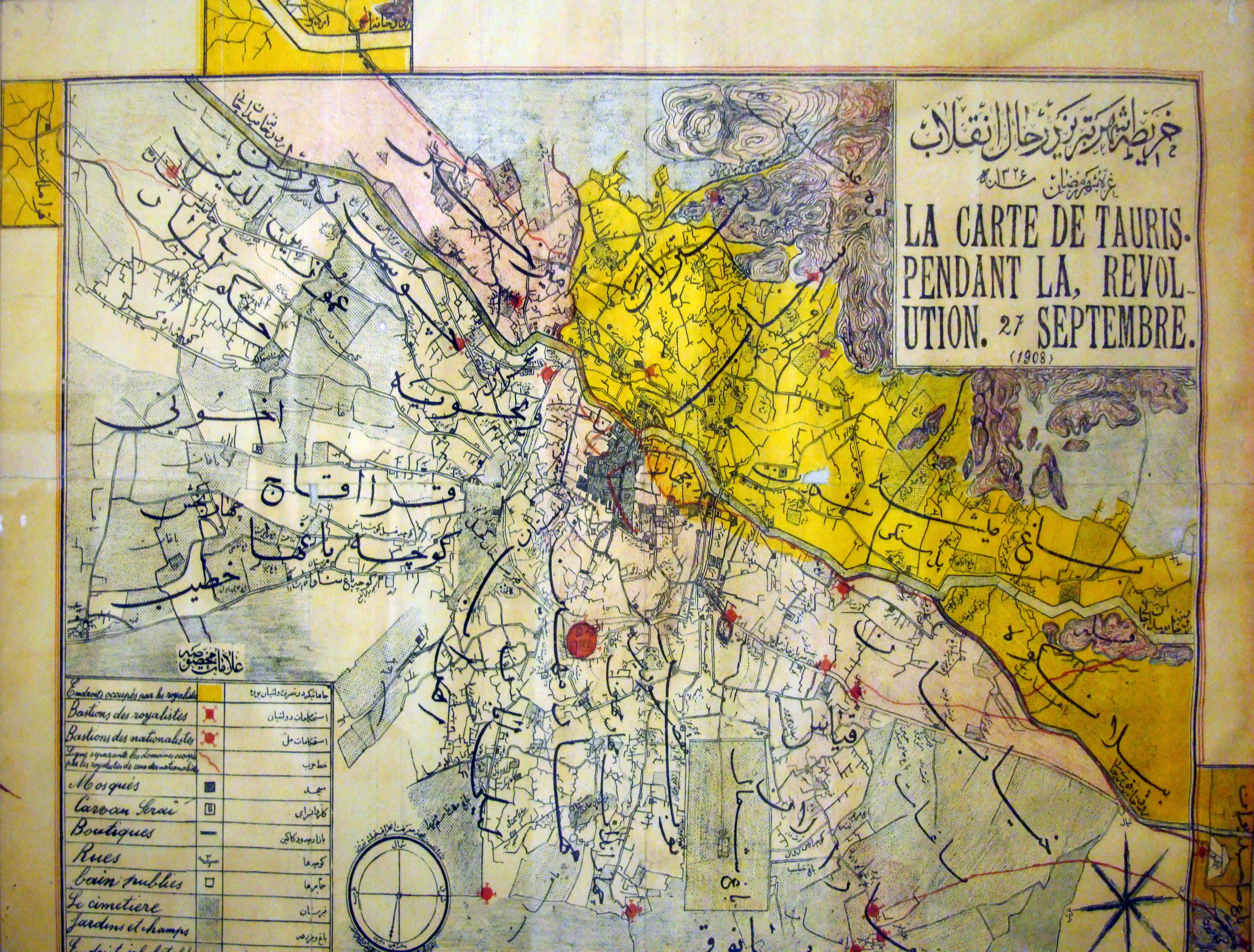
Map of the neighborhoods of Tabriz, including the Lilava neighborhood, during the Constitutional Revolution, 1908.

The Lilava district, also known as the Leilabad district, is one of the districts of the Iranian city of Tabriz which was predominantly, and at times exclusively, inhabited by Armenians. At the beginning of the 20th century, the Armenian community of Tabriz, which numbered some 6,000, lived in the districts of Lilava and Ḡala (Armenian: Berdaṭʿał). The district played a crucial role in the early years of the Armenian Revolutionary Federation.

One of the historical quarters located in the southern part of Tabriz is Lilava. The quarter is bordered to the north by Miyar-Miyar, to the south by the Yaniq Mountain range, to the east by the Charandab quarter (present-day Taleqani Street), and to the west by Baranava, Ahrab, Gaziran, as well as Khayyam and Lalezar streets.

== History ==
In earlier times, the Lilava quarter was connected to other neighborhoods through passages and large alleys. The first modern street, Shariati Street (formerly Shahnaz), was constructed in 1950. Subsequently, new streets such as Western 17 Shahrivar (Old), Eastern 17 Shahrivar (now Shahid Qazi Street), Saeb Street (formerly the prison), and Pastor Street were established. The center of the Lilava quarter in the past was located in front of the Mashhadi Iman Mosque (also known as Rangli Mosque) and the square in front of the Haj Mirza Agha Farshi Mosque (formerly Shah Reza, today Imam Reza Square). In earlier times, the Lilava quarter contained numerous qanāts (underground water channels) that originated from the Yaniq Mountains and supplied irrigation to all the gardens and houses. Nader Mirza provides the following account:

... The water supply of this quarter came from the Valman qanāt, the Haj Mohammad-Baqer qanāt, and the Agha Pahlavan Heybat spring. The Armenians of the city predominantly resided in this quarter. Several Christian families lived here, and a church was also constructed. It is certain that the headman of the Christians was Haji Amir Khan Kandozan, while the Muslims were under Habibollah Khan. This quarter and Charandab both lay to the south...

According to Nader Mirza, the quarter and the southern parts of the city were crossed by several qanāts:

... The Haj Mohsen qanāt, the Tumas qanāt, the Pahlavan qanāt, the Great Soltan qanāt, the Small Soltan qanāt, Heybat, Zafarānlu, the qanāt of Hakim Sahib, the English physician, the Haj Mohammad-Baqer qanāt, the Kurjan qanāt, and the Haj Seyyed Hossein qanāt...

== Etymology ==
In the Azerbaijani Turkic language, the word līl means sediment, deposit, or mud. Accordingly, Lilava was a place that in the past was continuously covered with silt and mud due to floodwaters, especially those descending from the Yaniq Mountains.

== Localities ==
Among the quarters and sub-districts affiliated with Lilava are: the Laklar quarter, the Vaez quarter, the Agha Ali quarter, Ganjali Bey (17 Shahrivar), Mayan Ni Lar (Saeb Street), Yusef Khan (Pastor Street), Qarabāghlilar, the Ghazal quarter (an Armenian-inhabited area), the Valman quarter, the Qanareh quarter, and the Hatam Bey quarter.

== See also ==
- Baron Avak

== Sources ==
- Amurian, A.; Kasheff, M. (1986). "ARMENIANS OF MODERN IRAN". Archived copy. Encyclopaedia Iranica. Archived from the original on 2018-10-26.
- Berberian, Houri (2001). Armenians and the Iranian Constitutional Revolution of 1905-1911. Westview Press. ISBN 978-0813338170.
- Chaquèri, Cosroe (1998). The Armenians of Iran: The Paradoxical Role of a Minority in a Dominant Culture; Articles and Documents. Center for Middle Eastern Studies of Harvard University. ISBN 978-0932885166.
- Khamāchī, Behruz (1398), Shahr-e man Tabriz, Təbriz: Nedā-ye Shams
- Behzādī, Behzād (1375), Farhang-e Āzarbāyjānī–Fārsī, Tehrān: Nashr-e Donya
- Nāder Mīrzā (1323), Tārīkh va jughrāfiyā-ye Dār al-Salṭaneh-ye Tabrīz, Tehran: Iqbal
- Nowbarī, Ya‘qūb Moḥarramzāde (1398), Maḥalla-ye Līlābād-e Tabrīz dar Guzar-e Tārīkh, Ās̱ār-e Fākher
