= Topouzian =

Surname list

Topouzian or Topuzian is an Armenian surname. It may refer to:

- Ara Topouzian (born 1969), Armenian musician and kanon player
- Nshan Topouzian (born 1966), prelate and bishop of the Armenian Apostolic Church See of Cilicia
- Yervant Topouzian, Armenian activist, one of the 20 victims in The 20 Hunchakian gallows
