= Khiyaban =

Oldest district of Tabriz

Coordinates: 38.0500°N 46.3000°E

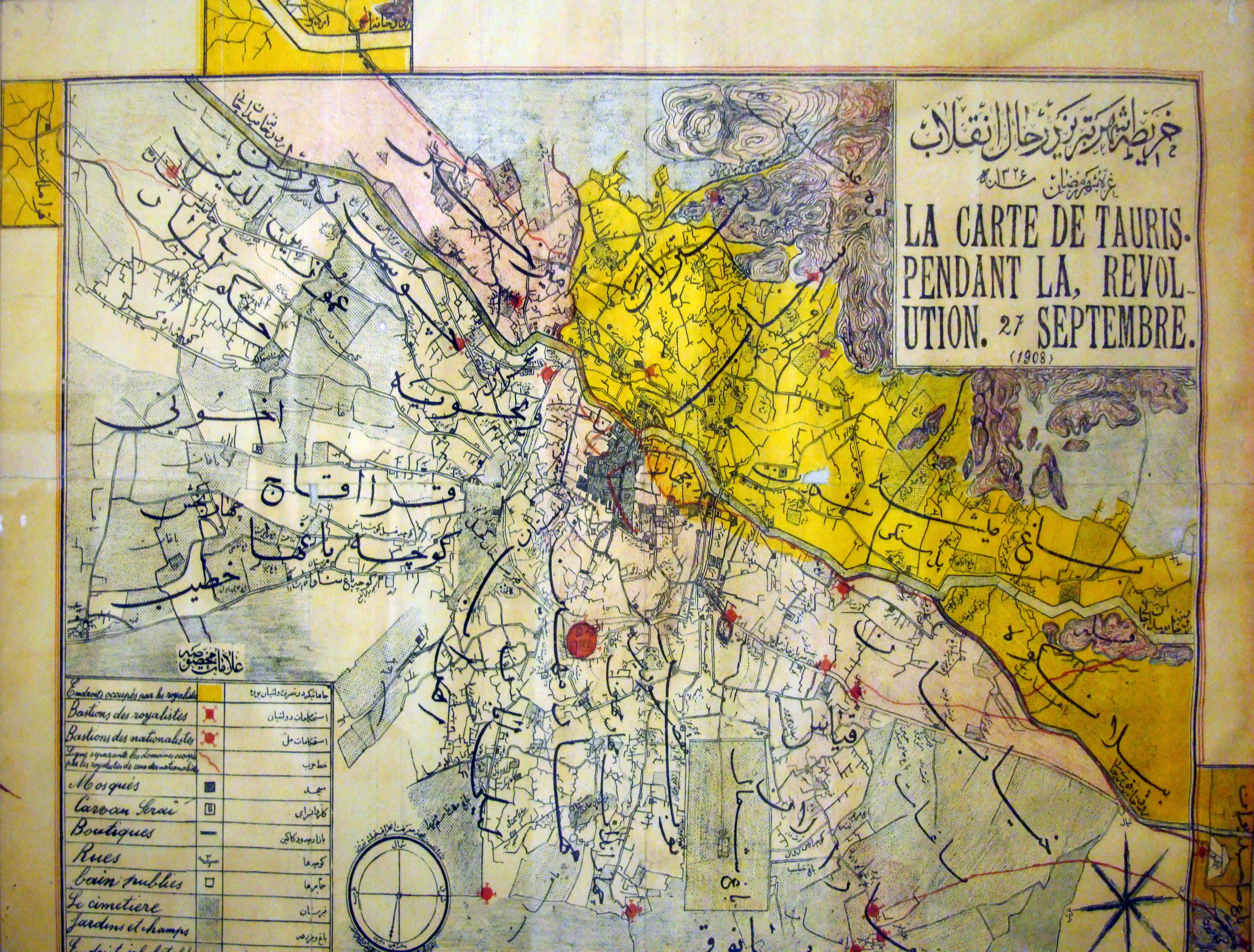
Map of Tabriz in 1908, during the Iranian Constitutional Revolution

Khiyaban (Persian: خیابان) is one of the oldest districts of Tabriz in northwestern Iran. Khiyaban is restricted to Meydan River, Maralan district and Azadi Blvd. During the Iranian Constitutional Revolution, Khiyaban was under the command of the revolutionary Baqir Khan and had an important role in the victory of the revolution.

== About the Neighborhood ==
=== Location ===
The Khiyaban neighborhood is bounded to the north by the Meydanchay River; to the south by the Qiyas neighborhood, the Arif Qiyas al-Din shrine, and the Maralan neighborhood; to the southwest by the Hasht-Behesht Palace and the Bagh-e Shomal area; to the southeast by Shatir Ulduzi; to the east by the Tehran Gate; to the west by the Nobar neighborhood, Nobar Gate, Artesh Street, and Sa’at Square; and to the northwest by the Tabriz Bazaar.

The neighborhood is home to the Blue Mosque, also known as the “Turquoise of Islam,” the Azerbaijan Museum, and the Iron Age Museum.

=== Notable Figures ===
Contemporary prominent figures from this neighborhood include Dr. Mohammad-Ali Sarikhani, the Abdiyazdani brothers—Haj Mohammad-Ali and Haj Mohammad-Hasan—Haj Khodaverdi Maliki-Tabrizi, his son-in-law Salar Qarabagi Sarigulu Khan, and Master Isfandiyar Qarabagi. Among the historical personalities who lived in this neighborhood are Baqir Khan, a leading figure in the Constitutional Revolution, and the renowned political activist and revolutionary Sheikh Mohammad Khiabani.

=== Historical Background ===
Nadir Mirza provides the following account of the neighborhood:

Khiyaban is located on the eastern side of the city. This large neighborhood occupies a strategic position: everyone arriving from Arak would first enter the wide and lengthy boulevard of this district. The boulevard stretched approximately three-quarters of a farsang in length and was sixty cubits wide. When I arrived in Tabriz, there were water canals flowing on both sides of the boulevard, with rows of poplar and coniferous trees planted alongside. These trees were arranged in straight lines, offering shade throughout the way. The road was guarded by officials appointed by the government. However, the trees had become old and decayed. They were gradually felled and replaced with young saplings, leaving the boulevard bare. This condition continued until the year 1290 AH. That year, when our sovereign Naser al-Din Shah passed through the city en route to Europe, the crown prince Mozaffar ad-Din Shah Qajar issued orders, and thanks to the efforts of Sahibdivan Mirza Fath-Ali Khan Shirazi, new canals and buildings were constructed, and black poplar, willow, and plane trees were planted. New guards were also assigned. Though the area has somewhat revived since then, it has never fully regained its former grandeur, nor will it ever… This neighborhood also has its own barzens [sub-neighborhoods]. Its current kandkhoda (local headman) is Karim Khan, who inherited the position from his father, also named Karim Khan. The latter was a renowned and influential figure during the regency of Abbas Mirza. However, at the beginning of Mohammad Shah’s reign, the grand vizier Haji Mirza Aqasi bore a grudge against him and had him dismissed through slander. As a result, he lived in exile for some time before eventually passing away.

Nadir Mirza also comments on the Zubayda qanat:

It is said that this qanat was constructed on the order of Zubayda, who contributed to the development of the city. However, I believe this attribution is mistaken—this city was not founded by Zubayda bint Jaʿfar (wife of Harun al-Rashid)... In the early years of my arrival in Tabriz, I had not heard of any water source more famous than the Zubayda spring. Its water was abundant and delicious, flowing through the royal palaces. A large part of the city depended on this qanat for water. Over time, numerous wells and tunnels were dug around it, leading to the gradual decline of the qanat. Its waters were diverted to neighboring qanats, eventually drying it out. Another qanat is the Fathabad qanat, named after the village of its origin, which is located southeast of Tabriz. At present, this qanat flows from the beginning of the boulevard toward the city...

=== Streets and Subsections ===
Among the neighborhood’s sections and streets are Damashqiyeh (Gümüşqaya), Reza Alley, the Khiyaban Market, Damirqapi (Khiyaban Gate), Qullar Street, Kalantar Street, Mirza Nasrullah Market, Dilkhun neighborhood, Mirchupan, Qarabaghis, Shahid Jadiri neighborhood, Tepelibagh, Seyyidlar Street, Seyyidzadeh Street, Yuxari Hammam Street, Hakim Mirza Salman Street, Chopur Square, Karim Khan Street, Sadr Street, and Salar Street.

The neighborhood’s center is considered to be Qutb Square, which locals refer to as Qurd Square. According to some travel accounts, this square was once used for wolf games and competitions between different neighborhoods’ “wolves” (likely a reference to symbolic or festive competitions).

=== Mosques and the Zubayda Qanat ===
Among the most prominent mosques in the Xiyavan neighborhood are the Blue Mosque, Karim Khan Mosque, Salar Mosque, Haji Ahmad Mosque, Chopur Mosque, Ayatollah Shahidi Mosque (Hakim Mirza Salman), and the Bazaar Mosque. The neighborhood’s primary water source was the Zubayda Khatun qanat, traditionally attributed to Zubayda, the wife of the Abbasid Caliph Harun al-Rashid.

== Photos ==
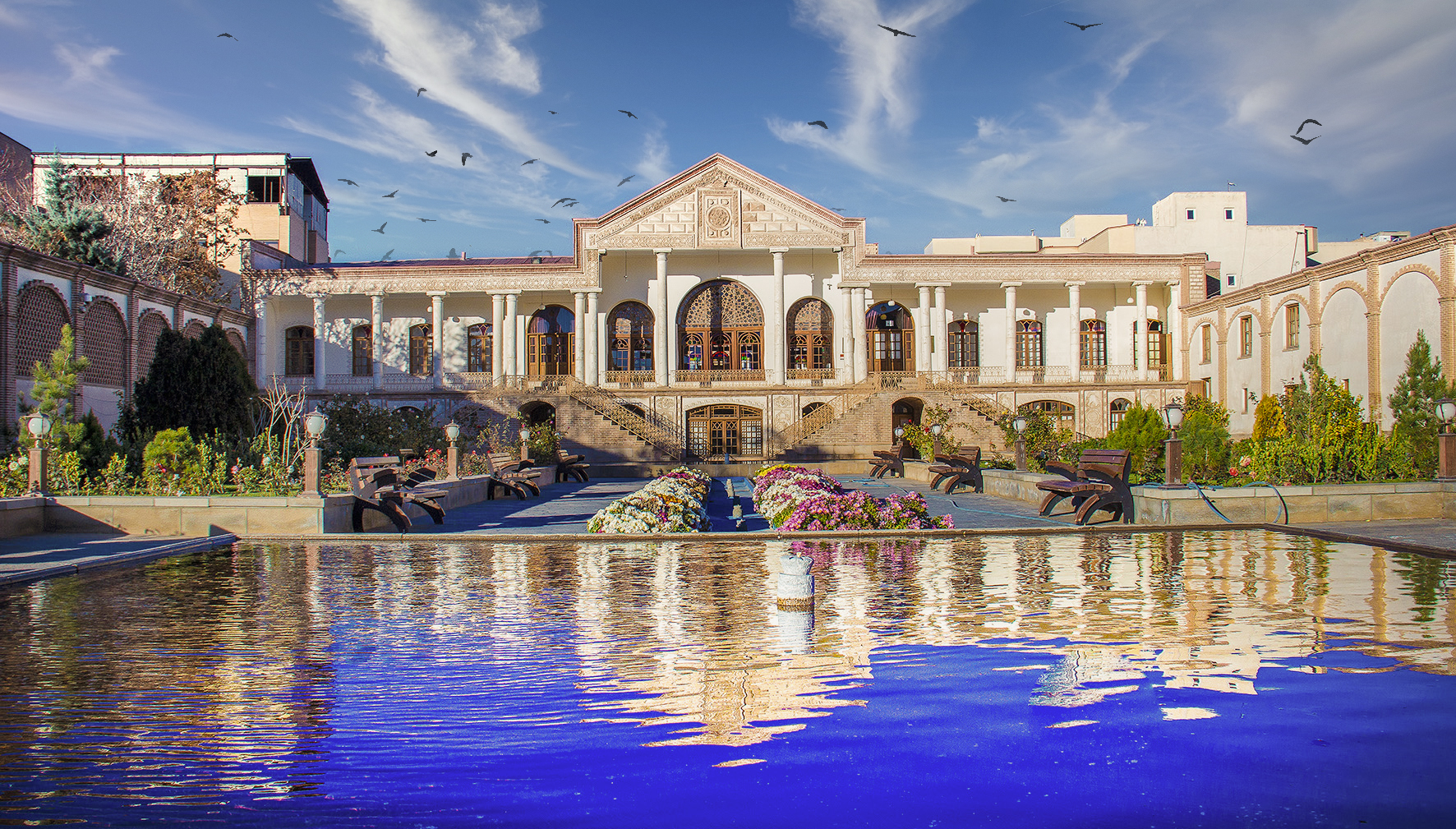
Amir Nezam House.

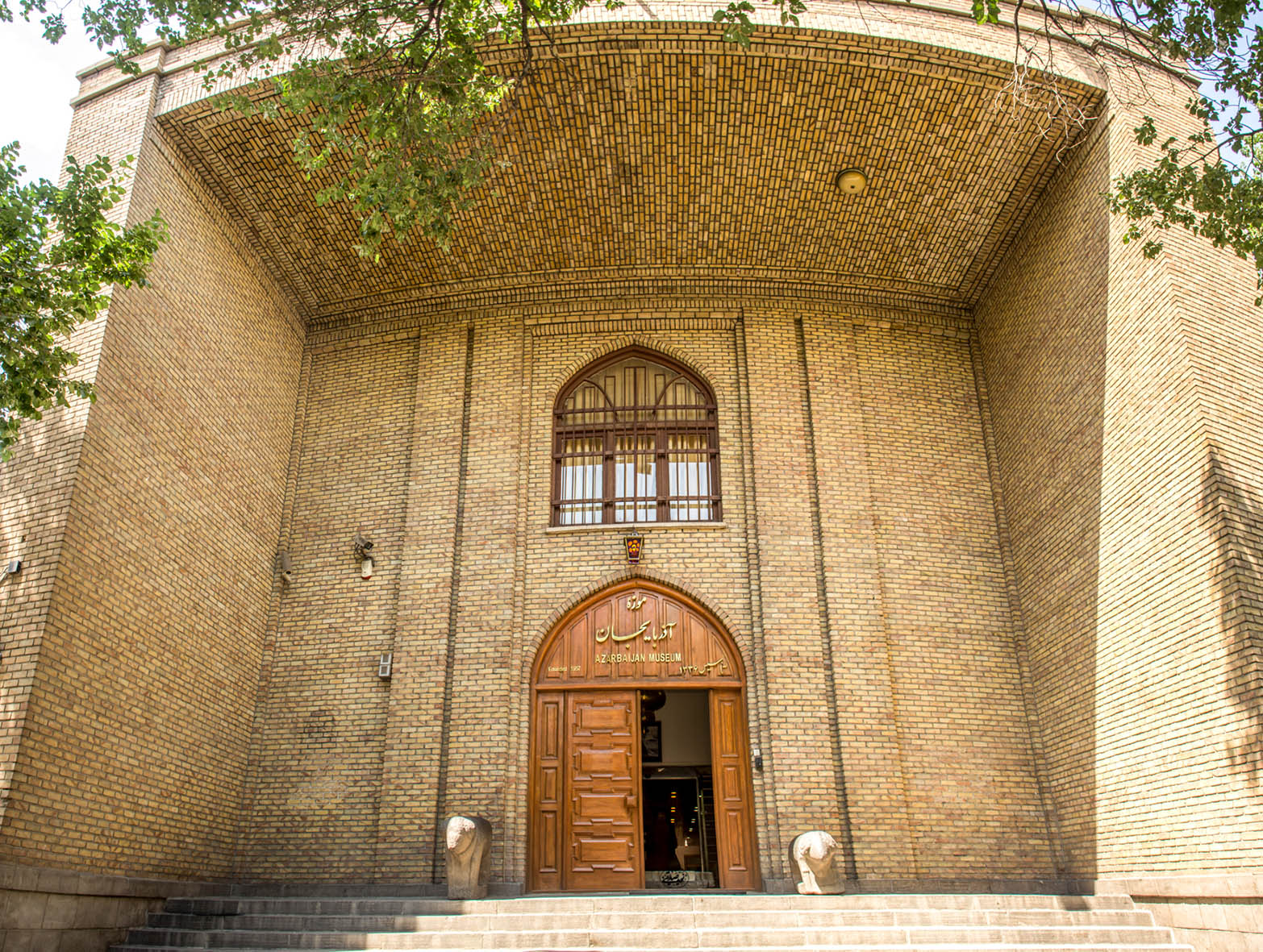
Azerbaijan Museum.

== Sources ==
- Nāder Mīrzā (1323), Tārīkh va jughrāfiyā-ye Dār al-Salṭaneh-ye Tabrīz, Tehran: Iqbal
- Mashkūr, Moḥammad-Javād (1352), Tārīkh-e Tabrīz tā pāyān-e qarn-e noh-e hejri, Tehran: Anjoman-e Āsār-e Mellī
- Khamāchī, Behruz (1398), Shahr-e man Tabriz, Təbriz: Nedā-ye Shams
