= St. Sarkis Church (Tabriz, East Azerbaijan, Iran) =

Armenian Apostolic Church in Iran

Saint Sarkis Church of Tabriz
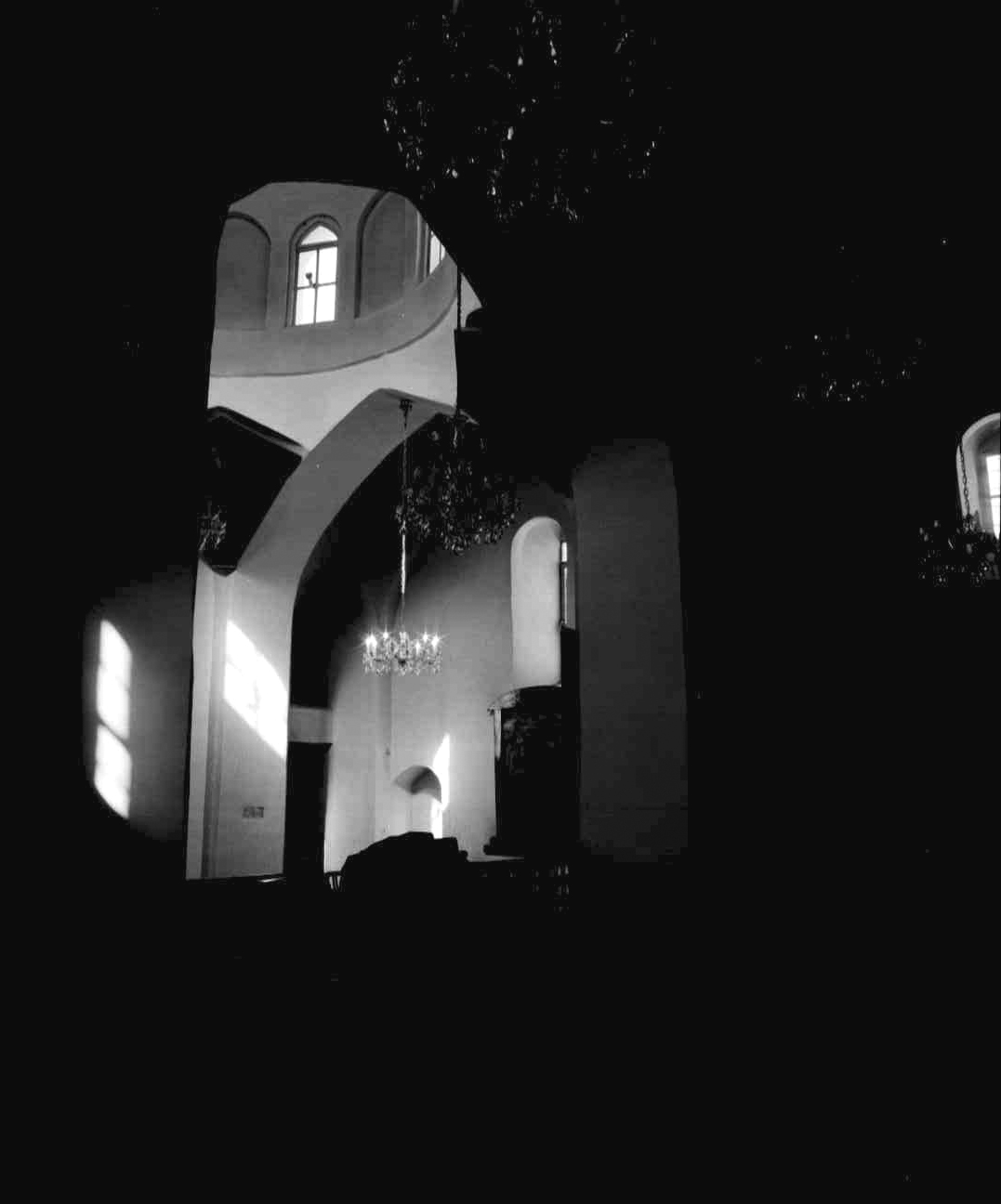
- Interior of St. Sarkis Church in Tabriz

- Location within Iran

Religion
- Affiliation: Armenian Apostolic Church
- Rite: Armenian
- Status: Functioning

Location
- Location: Tabriz, Iran
- Coordinates: 38°04′11″N 46°16′59″E

Architecture
- Style: Armenian
- Completed: 1821, rebuilt 1845

Saint Sarkis Church (Armenian: Սուրբ Սարգիս Եկեղեցի, romanized: Surp Sarkis Yekeghetsi) is a Qajar-era Armenian Apostolic church in the Baron Avak neighborhood of Tabriz, Iran. St. Sarkis was built with funding from the Petrossian family. Built in 1845, the church is in the courtyard of Tamarian Armenian school building, which was extended out to add the Sahakian School. The Haykazyan school was located across from these, but was closed after being damaged in the Iran-Iraq war.

== See also ==
- Iranian Armenians
- List of Armenian churches in Iran
- Shoghakat Church of Tabriz
- Saint Mary Church of Tabriz
- St. Sarkis Church (disambiguation)
