= Nobar =

Iranian ancient and historical district

Coordinates: 38°04′51.52″N 46°17′24.42″E

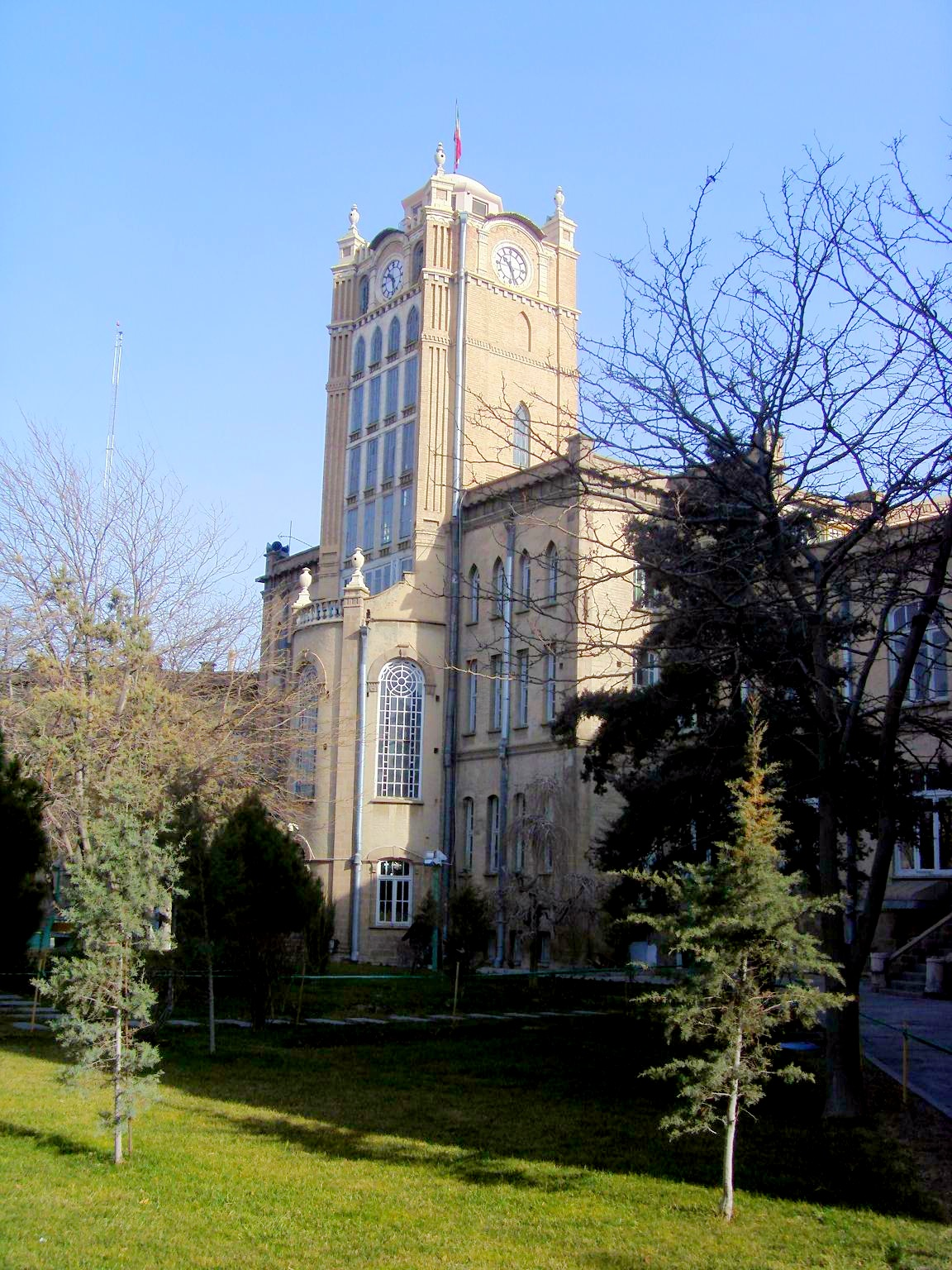
Tabriz Municipality Palace; this building was built by German forces on Nobar Cemetery.

Nobar (Persian: نوبر) is an ancient and historical district in south of Tabriz, Iran. Nobar bath and Saat Tower are located in this district. The Saat Tower was built by in 1934 at the site of the historical cemetery of the Nobar district.

== About ==
This neighborhood is bounded to the north by Rastakucha and Mahammahin, to the south by the Yaniq Tepeler (Hills), to the east by the neighborhoods of Khiyavan and Maralan, and to the west by Charandab and Mahammahin. Among the main streets of the Nobar neighborhood are Haji Isma‘il, Lalabey (now Shahid Yashari Street), Seyyeds (part of the Charandab area), and Maqsudiyya; the area also contains numerous winding alleyways. In addition, several historical subterranean canals (kahrizes) such as Akbarabad, Topchubashi, Fathullahov, Qorchubashi, and Mollabashi are located in this neighborhood. There are 26 different mosques in Nobar, the most prominent of which are the Qanli Mosque (part of the Charandab district) and the Meydan Mosque. The Bagh-e Shomal complex—comprising cultural, residential, military, and sports facilities—as well as the 21st Hamzeh Sayyid al-Shuhada military unit, are also located in this neighborhood. Its center is the Maqsudiyya Square, named after Maqsud Bey, one of the Safavid-era commanders.

Nadir Mirza writes the following about the Nobar neighborhood:

It is a rather large area located in the southern part of the city. It is densely populated, and the majority of its residents are affluent individuals engaged in commerce. For this reason, splendid buildings have been constructed throughout the neighborhood, with courtyards filled with fruitful trees and cypress groves. The fruits of this area are particularly distinguished. However, no ancient structures from earlier periods remain... The Kadkhuda of the neighborhood is a wise young man named Mirza Lutfali Khan. He inherited this position from his father and, in reference to his father’s title, he too is known as 'Kandkhudabashi'. He is a member of a noble lineage, and his uncle served as a representative in the Divankhaneh. A mosque bearing the name 'Kandkhudabashi' still exists in the neighborhood.

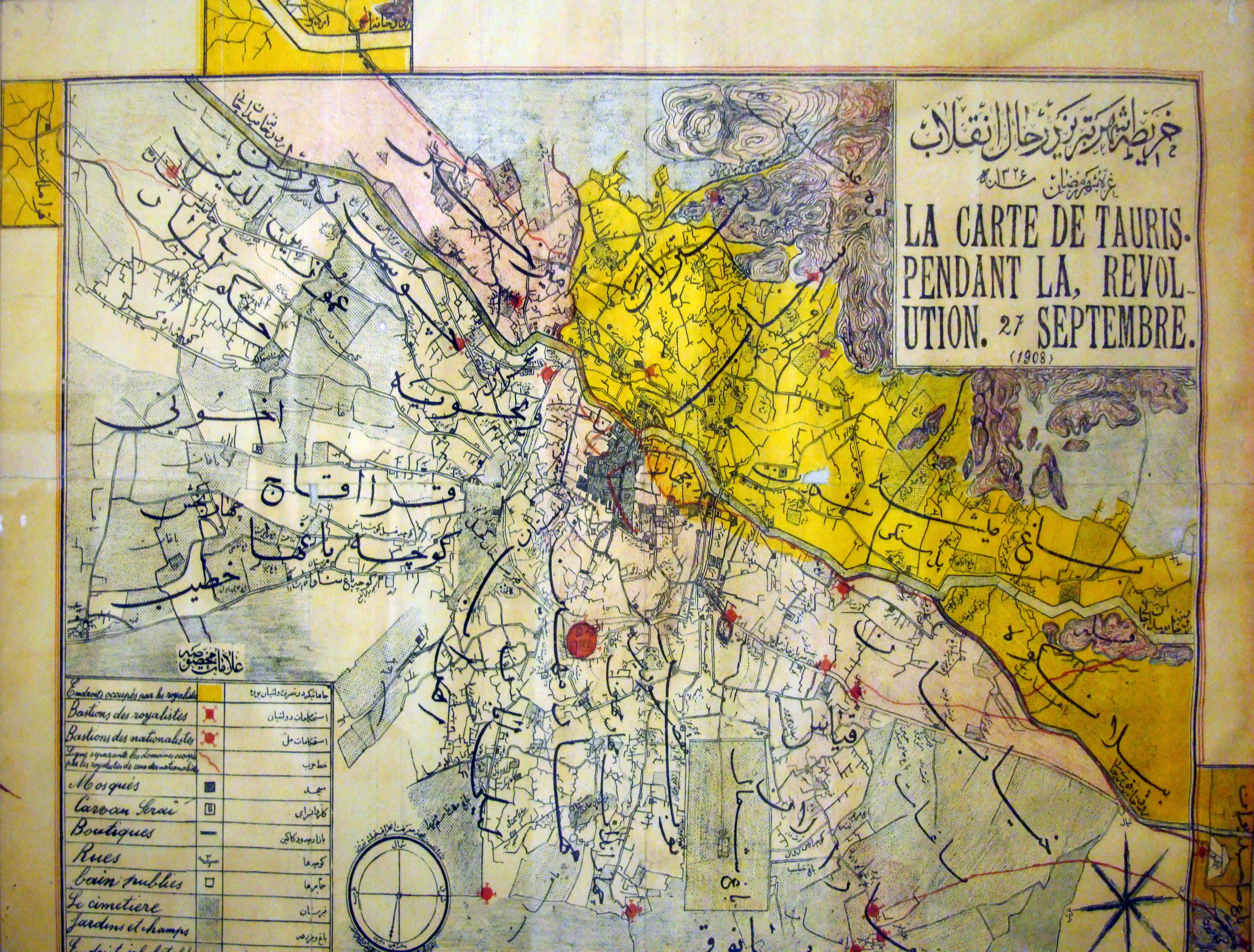
Map of Tabriz neighborhoods from 1908.

Husayn Hafiz Tabrizi, in his work Ruzat al-Janan, states the following about the neighborhood:

In a place called Sarpol within Nobar lies the tomb of Amir Sayyid Rukn al-Din Gurjani, marked by a tall dome. Next to it is also a khanqah said to belong to a vizier named Jalal Turra...The Maqsudiyya structure is likewise situated in this neighborhood. This building once belonged to Maqsud Bey, the son of Aq Qoyunlu ruler Hasan Padshah, and the name of the Maqsudiyya neighborhood is derived from this figure.

=== Historical Monuments ===
The Nobar neighborhood contains a number of significant historical and architectural landmarks. These include Amir Bazaar, Cotton Dealers' Bazaar, Qa'em-Maqam Bazaar, Coppersmiths’ Bazaar, Sad al-Mulk Small Bazaar, Farashbashi Small Bazaar, Mirza Arzi Bridge, Chaparkhaneh (postal station), Qazi Hammam (public bath), the house of Haji Sayyid Baqir, the house of Haji Mirza Shafi Aghamujtahid, the house of Haji Samad Tahbaz, the house of Mohammad Agha Sartib, the house of Haji Mirza Yusif Agha, the house of Mirza Arzi, the house of Mirza Jalil Chaparbashi, the house of Mirza Hasan Qafi, the house of Mirza Sadiq Khan Rais, the house of Nizam al-Ulama, Baghmesheh Gate, the caravanserais of Haji Sayyid Husayn, Haji Shaykh Jafar, Haji Mirza Jafar, Haji Husayn, Khalil Bey, the people of Maragheh, Mortazaqulu, Mehdi Khan Farashbashi, Mirza Isma‘il, and Mirza Taqi Ajudanbashi, as well as the Mirza Ibrahim Mosque, Mirza Mahdi Qazi Mosque and his mausoleum, Chubuqchular Square, and the Seven Bald Men Square.

One of the neighborhood’s historical monuments, the Nobar Gate, was demolished during the Pahlavi dynasty.

=== Famous persons ===
- Mohammad Ali Tarbiat
- Ali Musyo
