= Shoghakat =

Shoghakat may also refer to:

- Shoghakat Church, Vagharshapat (Etchmiadzin), Armavir Province, Armenia
- Shoghakat Church of Tabriz, East Azerbaijan Province, Iran
- Shoghakat, Armenia, a village on Lake Sevan, Gegharkunik Province, Armenia
- Shoghakat TV, an Armenian television channel based in Yerevan, Armenia
