= Shoghakat Church of Tabriz =

Armenian Apostolic Church in Iran

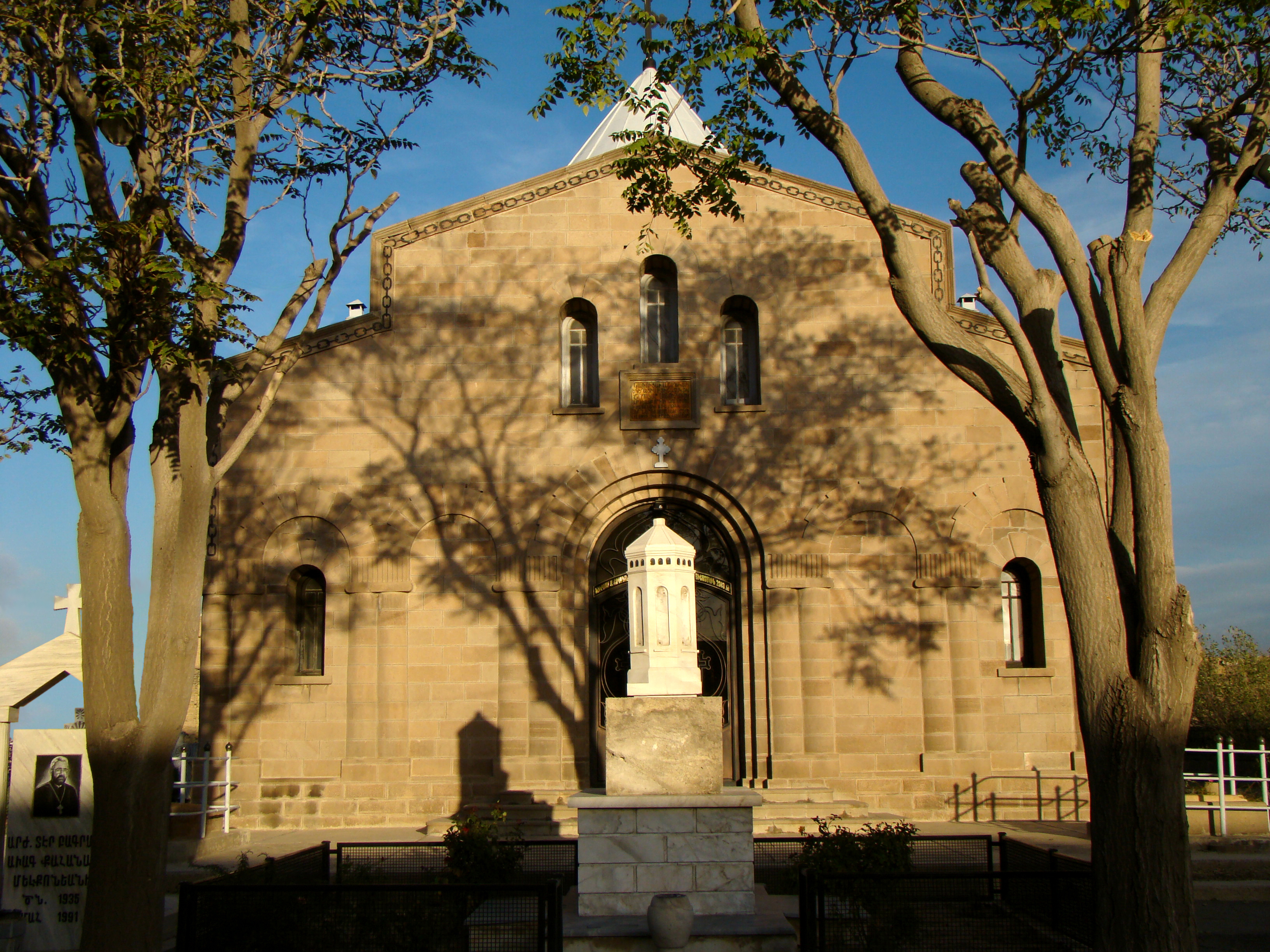
- Shoghakat Church of Tabriz

- Location within Iran

Religion
- Affiliation: Armenian Apostolic Church
- Rite: Armenian
- Status: Functioning

Location
- Location: Tabriz, Iran
- Coordinates: 38°03′22″N 46°17′02″E

Architecture
- Style: Armenian
- Completed: 1940

The Shoghakat Church or Shoghagat Church (Armenian: Թաւրիզի Սուրբ Շողակաթ եկեղեցի, Շողակաթ եկեղեցի, T’avrizhi Surb Shoghakat yekeghets’i, Persian: کلیسای شوغاگات مقدس) is an Armenian Apostolic church in Tabriz, East Azerbaijan province, Iran completed in 1940.

== Location ==
Saint Shoghakat Church is located at the Armenian cemetery of Tabriz, which is surrounded by Charm Street, Mashruteh-Boulevard and Bolvar-e-Mollasadra, at Charm Street opposite to the Faculty of Architecture of Tabriz Islamic Arts University, the former Khosravi Leather Factory, not far from the southern end of South Shariati (South Shahnaz).

== History ==
In old times, the Armenian Christians of Tabriz used to bury their deceased at the cemetery near Mariam-Nanna Church in Maralan. In the 1850s, the land of the new Armenian cemetery of Tabriz was purchased by the Diocese of Tabriz when Sahak Satunyan was bishop. However, the church was built only in the 20th century. Construction of Saint Shoghakat Church was financed by Simon Manocherian, a leather-manufacturing director whose mother's name was Shoghakat, and completed in 1940.

The name of the church refers to a ray of light (Շողակաթ) that came down from heaven upon 38 Armenian nuns martyred by the pagan Armenian King Trdat around AD 301 at the site of the famous original Shoghakat Church of Etchmiadzin in Armenia built in the 6th century. Seeing Heaven's Light, Trdat converted to Christendom, and Armenia became the first Christian country.

== Architecture ==
The shape of the church is rectangular with four square columns located in the middle carrying the dome, dividing the interior into two naves on both sides and a wider main nave in the middle. The entrance to the building is on the western side facing the sanctuary in the east. The exterior stone facades of the church are framed with semicircular and oval arches on north, south and west side.

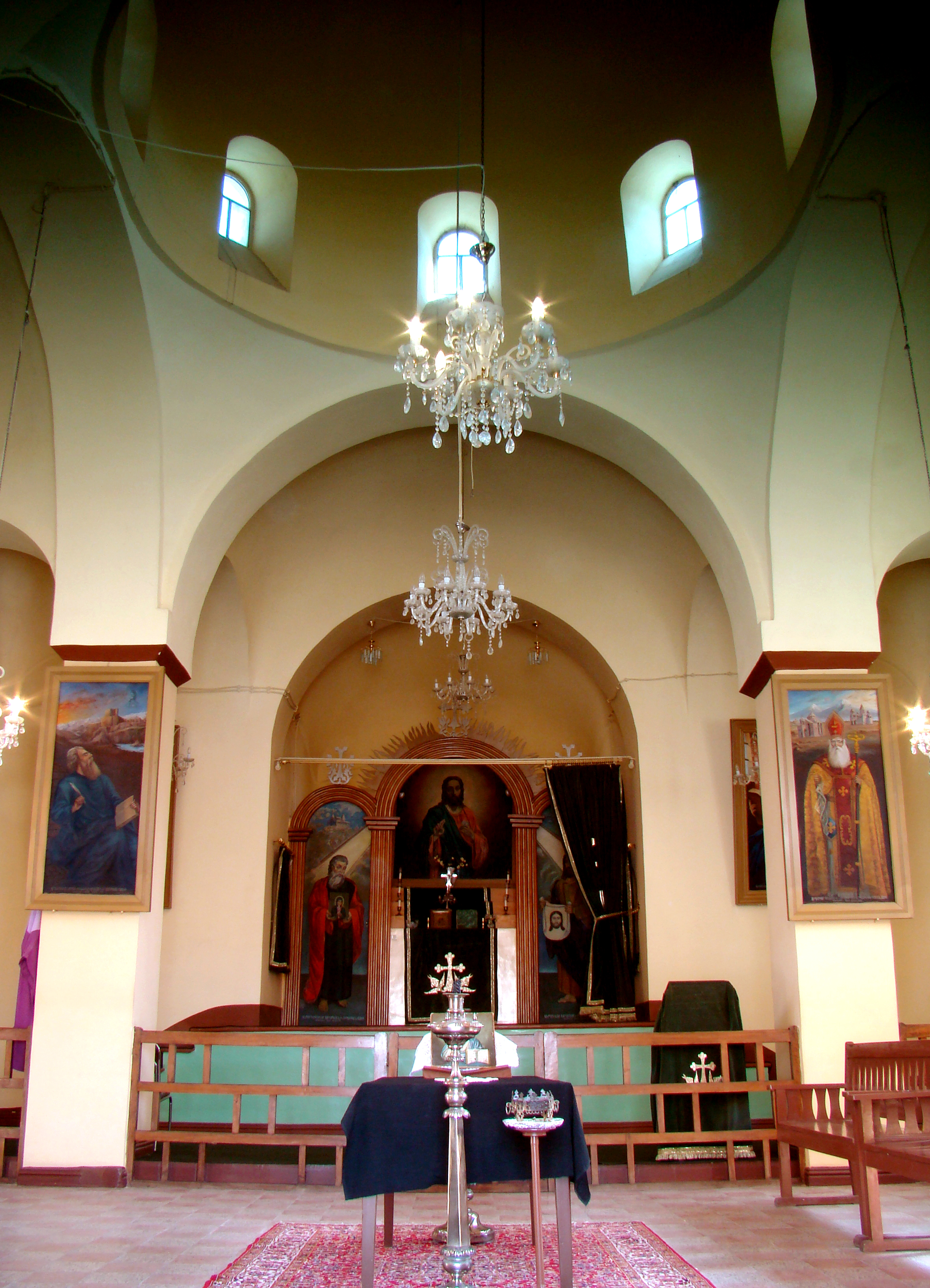
Interior of Shoghakat church of Tabriz.

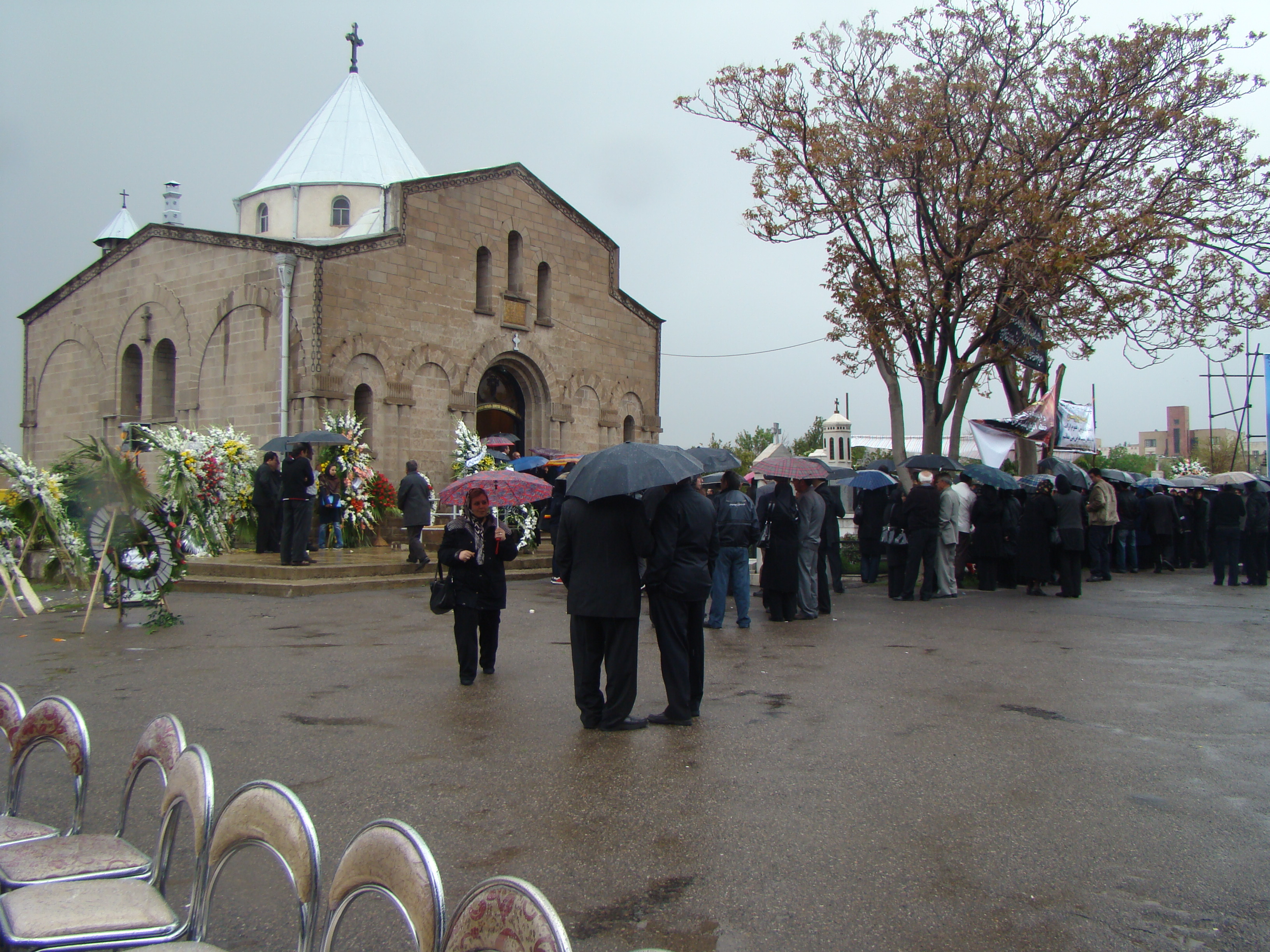
Interment of Nshan Topouzian, 5 May 2010.

== Notable burials ==
- Edward Burgess (1810–1855), merchant and Naser al-Din Shah Qajar's principal translator
- Nshan Topouzian (1966–2010), Prelate of Atrpatakan, buried in front of the entrance to the church.
- Nerses Melik Tangyan, Prelate of Atrpatakan during the First and Second World Wars for 40 years
- Bagrat, Prelate of Atrpatakan who died in 1991
- Poghos Poghosyan, who came to Tabriz as an orphan child who immigrated to Tabriz during the Armenian Genocide in the Ottoman Empire from the south of Lake Van, was cared for by Catholics and converted to Catholicism and became a Catholic priest
- Manocherian family (Simon Manocherian's father, died 1944, and mother Shoghagat, died 1939)
- Dr. Aslanian (died 1940)
- Howard Baskerville (1885–1909) – American teacher in the American Memorial School in Tabriz
- Monument to the Armenian martyrs of Khoy massacred in 1918 by the Ottoman army

== See also ==
- Iranian Armenians
- List of Armenian churches in Iran
- Saint Mary Church of Tabriz
- Saint Sargis Church of Tabriz
