= Edward Burgess (merchant) =

English merchant

- Persian: Berjīs Ṣāḥeb
- Born: 1810; United Kingdom
- Died: 18 June 1855 (aged 44–45); Tabriz, Iran
- Burial place: Armenian cemetery of Tabriz (later part of the city's Shoghakat Church)
- Occupations: Merchant, translator
- Spouse: Anna (m. 1851; died 1855)
- Children: 2

Edward Burgess (known in Persian as Berjīs Ṣāḥeb; 1810–18 June 1855) was an English merchant and British subject in Qajar Iran, who became a court functionary under the Qajar rulers.

== Biography ==
Edward and his brother Charles first established themselves in the northwestern Iranian city of Tabriz in the early 1830s, specializing in the import of Manchester cotton goods. At some point Edward was hired by prince Bahman Mirza as printer, translator and tutor. Bahman Mirza was interested in geography, European history and modern natural history, with Edward being the best he could find to satisfy this curiosity. In 1846 Edward presented the Joghrafiya-yi Alam ("Geography of the World"), originally commissioned by Bahman Mirza, to the ruling king (shah) Mohammad Shah (r. 1834–1846). The work also contained some historical accounts of modern Europe. Although the text of this translation was a hundred years old, Edward found himself able to update its content aided by several contemporary European gazetteers. Following Bahman Mirza's defection to Tsarist Russia, Edward entered the service of prince Naser al-Din Mirza (later ruling as Naser al-Din Shah, r. 1848–1896).

Upon Naser al-Din's accession to the throne, Edward was promoted to become his principal translator, perhaps at the recommendation of Mirza Taqi Khan (later known as Amir Kabir), then vazir-e nezam of the Azerbaijan province. He appointed him to oversee (mobasherat) the contents of the Ruzname-ye vaqaye-e ettefaqiya, a famous Persian newspaper established in 1851 by Amir Kabir, chief minister during the first four years of Naser al-Din Shah's reign. Following the murder of Amir Kabir in 1852, Burgess complained that the procedure for publication of the newspaper had deteriorated significantly, to the extent that he "publish[ed] nothing except the foreign news, without the prime minister's having previously revised it" and that he was "obliged to consult the prime minister and also sometimes the king himself about articles to be put in the gazette".

== Personal life ==
He married Anna, an Armenian, from Tabriz in 1851. They had a son named John who died in 1855, being 18 months old, and a daughter called Fanny who survived to adulthood. Edward was buried at the Armenian cemetery which later became part of the city's Shoghakat Church.

A collection of letters between Edward and his family members is among the Burgess family papers donated to the New York Public Library. The Burgess family papers document three generations of an English family involved in overseas commerce. Edward and Charles were the first British subjects to export good directly from England to Persia. The papers contain correspondence, diaries, financial records, art work and other materials documenting the personal life and commercial activities of the family members. The papers provide abundant information on a rich variety of British, Anglo-Persian and Anglo-American topics.

== Sources ==
- Amanat, Abbas (1997). Pivot of the Universe: Nasir Al-Din Shah Qajar and the Iranian Monarchy, 1831-1896. I.B.Tauris. ISBN 978-1845118280.
- Karimi-Hakkak, Ahmad (1990). "CENSORSHIP". In Yarshater, Ehsan (ed.). Encyclopædia Iranica. Vol. V/2: C̆ehel Sotūn, Isfahan–Central Asia XIII. London and New York: Routledge & Kegan Paul. pp. 135–142. ISBN 978-0-939214-69-3.
- Wright, Denis (1998). "Burials and Memorials of the British in Persia". Iran: Journal of the British Institute of Persian Studies. 36 (1): 165–173. doi:10.2307/4299982. JSTOR 4299982.
- Wright, Denis (2002). "GREAT BRITAIN ii. An Overview of Relations: Safavid to the Present". In Yarshater, Ehsan (ed.). Encyclopædia Iranica. Vol. XI/2: Golšani–Great Britain IV. London and New York: Routledge & Kegan Paul. pp. 201–208. ISBN 978-0-933273-62-7.
