= Baron Avak =

Coordinates: 38.0710°N 46.2853°E

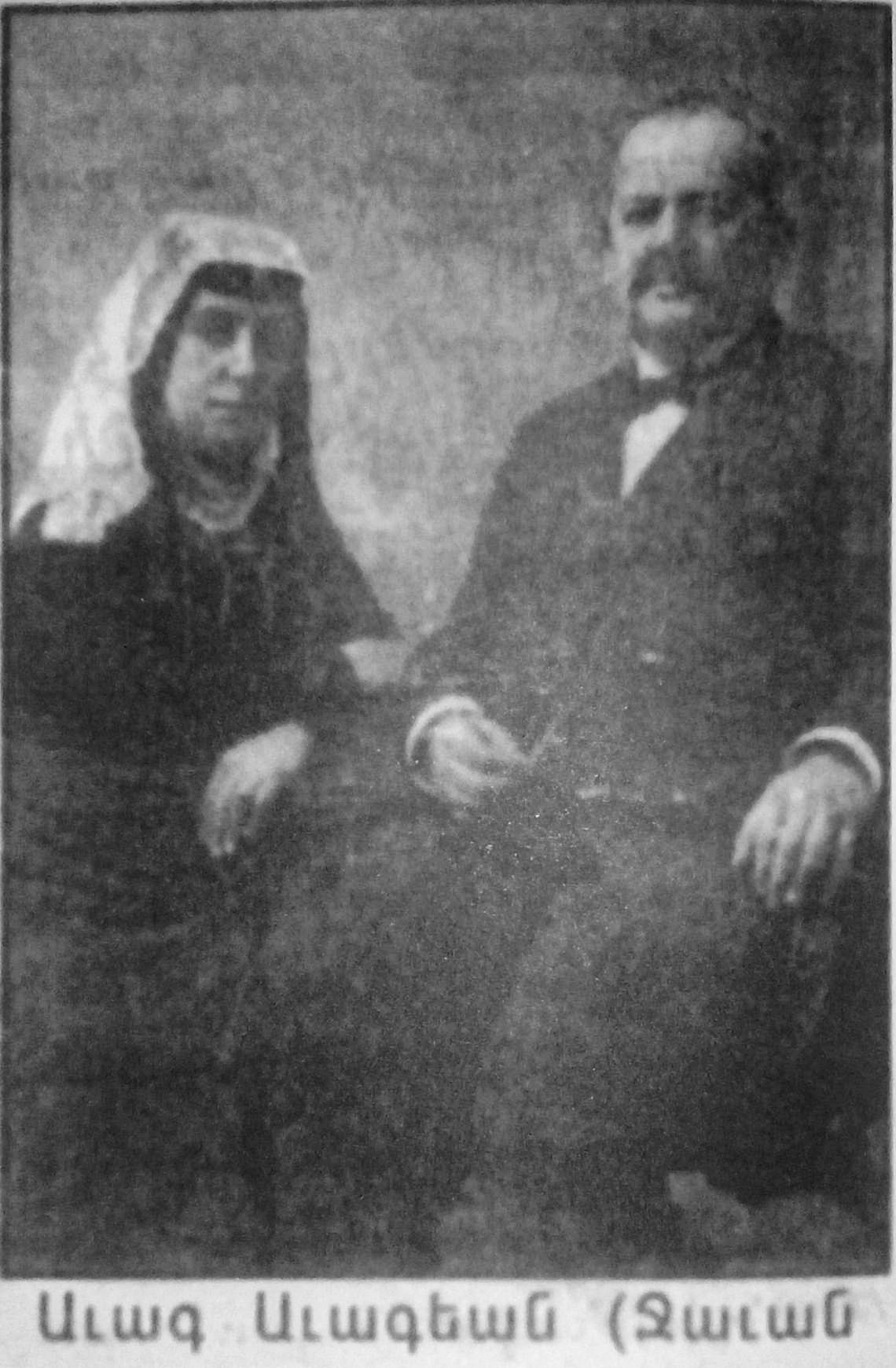
Avak Avakian

Baron Avak (Azerbaijani: Barnava, Persian: بارون آواک, Armenian: Պարոն Աւագ) is an old neighbourhood in the city center of Tabriz in northwestern Iran. The inhabitants of Baron Avak are mostly among the Iranian Armenian minority of Tabriz. The neighbourhood contains several historic and contemporary buildings and organizations dedicated to the Armenians of Tabriz, such as several churches (e.g., Surp Sarkis Church), sportsclubs, gardens and schools. The name of the neighbourhood comes after Avak Avakian, who was the wealthy founder of the neighbourhood in nineteenth century.

== See also ==
- Lilava
