= Maralan =

Historic district in Tabriz, Iran

Coordinates: 38°03′20.65″N 46°19′2.50″E

Maralan (Persian: مارالان) is a historic district in the southeastern part of Tabriz, the biggest city in Iranian Azerbaijan. To the north lies the Khiyaban district, and to the west, Maralan shares an order with the Nobar district. The Azadi Blvd. divides Maralan district into a northern and southern part.
