= Saint Mary Church of Tabriz =

Church in Tabriz, Iran

Saint Mary Church
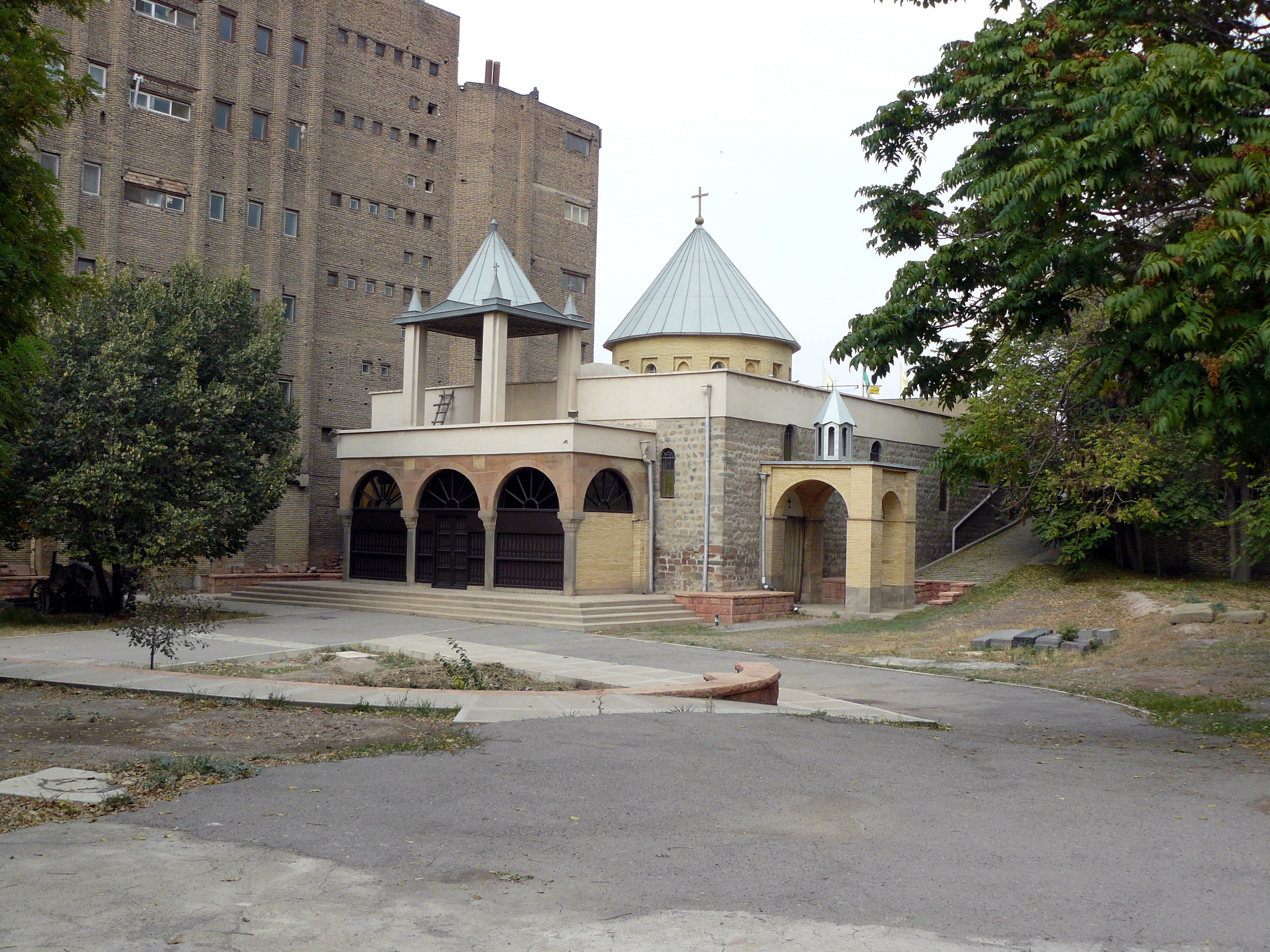
- Saint Mary church of Tabriz

- Location within Iran

Religion
- Affiliation: Armenian Apostolic Church
- Rite: Armenian
- Status: Functioning

Location
- Location: Tabriz, Iran
- Coordinates: 38.079012°N 46.288189°E

Architecture
- Style: Armenian
- Completed: 1785

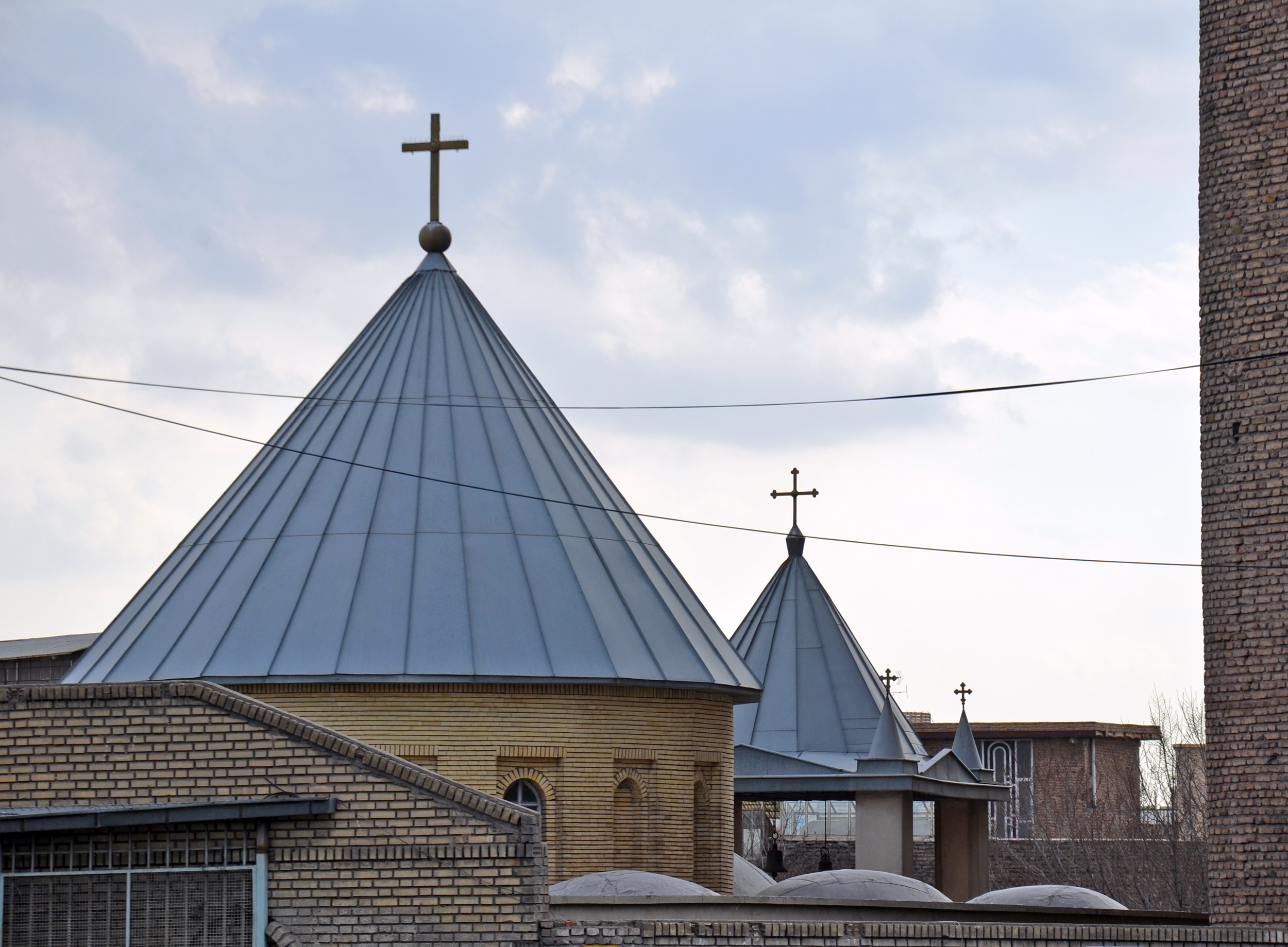
Roof of Saint Mary church of Tabriz

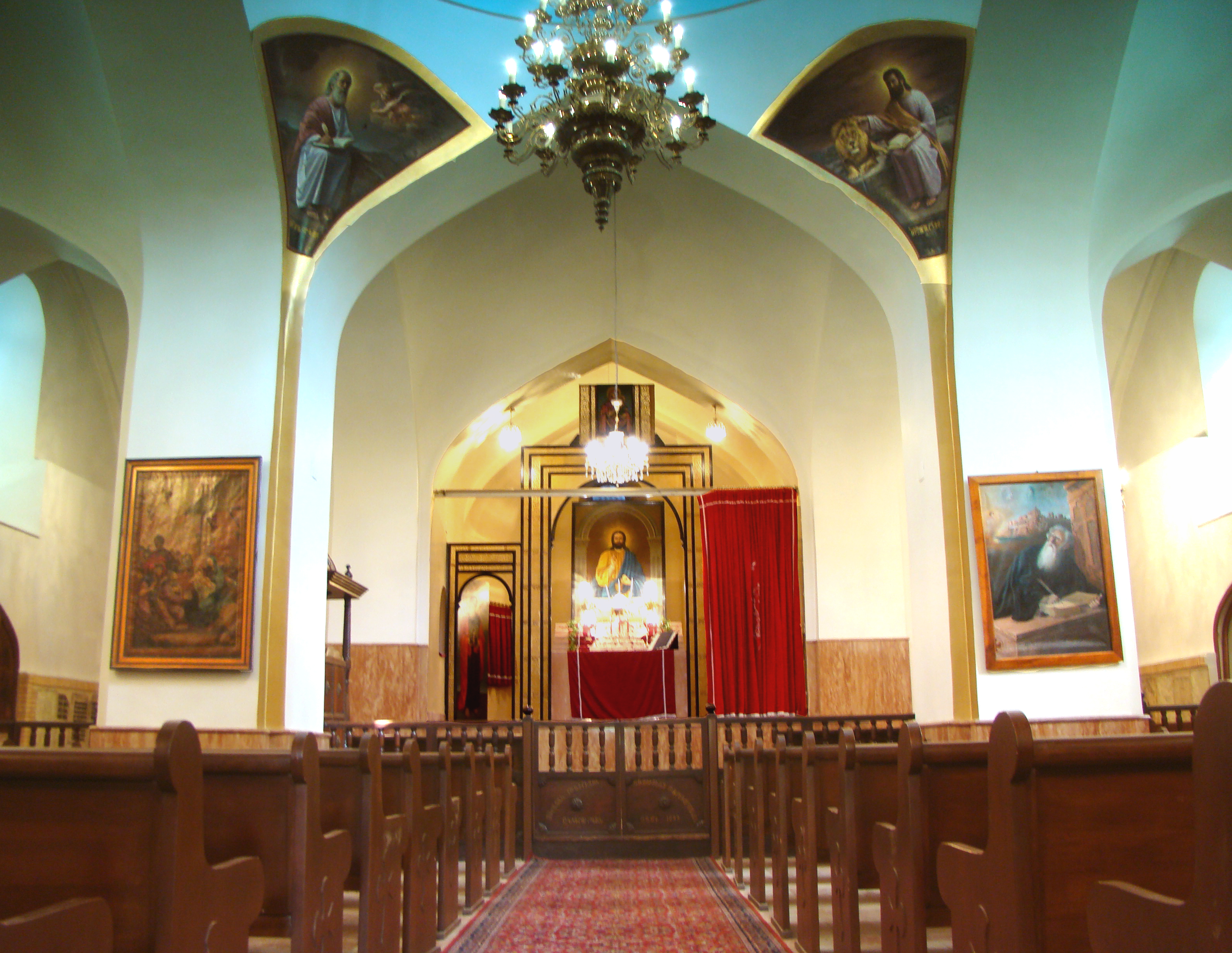
Interior of Saint Mary church of Tabriz

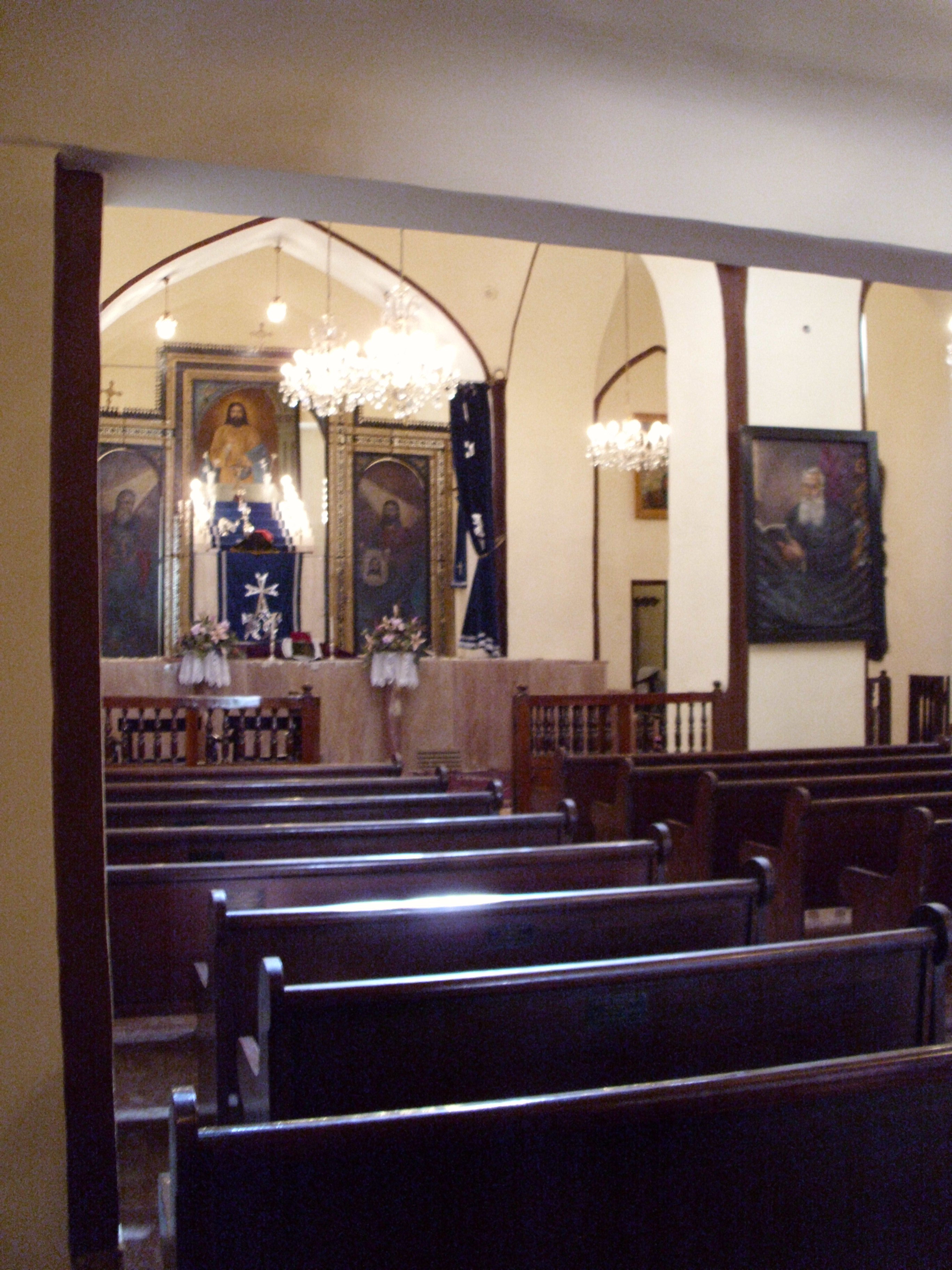
Interior of Saint Mary church of Tabriz

Saint Mary Church, Holy Mother of God Church or Surp Mariam Asdvadzadzin Church (Armenian: Թավրիզի Սուրբ Մարիամ Աստվածածին եկեղեցի, T’avrizhi Surb Mariam Astvatsatsin yekeghets’i, Persian: کلیسای مریم مقدس) is an Armenian Apostolic church in Tabriz, East Azerbaijan Province, Iran completed in 1785. It is the largest and oldest Christian church in Tabriz and a notable centre for Armenian national and religious ceremonies held by the Armenian community of Tabriz.

== Location ==
The church is located at the corner of North Shariati (north Shahnaz) and Jomhuri avenues in the historical Dik Bashi neighborhood in the center of Tabriz. For many years, Saint Mary's served as the seat of the Azarbaijan Armenian archbishop. It is a handsomely built edifice, with annex buildings sprawled over a large area. A board of Armenian peers governs the well-attended church. The Tabriz Armenian Museum next to the church is run by the Armenian Prelacy of Tabriz.

== History ==
An older church was built at this site in the 12th century AD (6th century AH). In his travel chronicles, Marco Polo, who traveled through Tabriz around 1275 AD, mentions this church on his way to China.

The oldest gravestone in this church dates back to the 16th century AD. The church has a stone hinge that according to the decor, the type of arch and the architectural features can be attributed to the 13th century AD (7th century AH) and the period of the Mongolian Ilkhan in Iran. According to an inscription, the church – as well as the whole city – was destroyed in a disastrous earthquake in 1780 AD, and the present building was built on its ruins from 1782 to 1785 in Safavid style.

== Architecture ==
The church is 16 meters long and 14 meters wide. The belfry standing on four square columns in the middle of the church has four arches with biblical painting between the columns.

The tabernacle of the church was built in the style of Armenian architecture, parts of which can be dated back to the 12th century AD. The base of the church was made of limestone. The walls and pillars are of stone and brick, the vault of brick.

== Bibliography ==
- عبدالعلی کارنگ، آثار باستانی آذربایجان (تهران: انجمن آثار ملی، ۱۳۵۱)، صفحه: ۱۹۲ [Abdol Ali Karang, Ancient Archeological Works of Azerbaijan. Tehran: National Monuments, 1351 (1972), p. 192.]
- تبریز به روایت تصویر، ابراهیم پورحسین خونیق، انتشارات، چاپ اول، تبریز ۱۳۸۲. [Tabriz by narration of the image, Ibrahim Pourhossein Khoniq, Publishing, First edition, Tabriz, 2003.]
- کلیساهای تاریخی ایران،درگاه کویر، معماری و بناها [Historical Churches of Iran, Desert Harbor, Architecture and buildings.]
- کتاب ارمنیان ایران، نویسنده:آندرانیک هویان، صفحههای (۱۱۱ تا ۱۵۷) انتشارات:مرکز بینالمللی گفتگوی تمدنها با همکاری انتشارات هرمس، تاریخ:۱۳۸۰، شابک:۲-۰۰۷-۳۶۳-۹۶۴ [Andranik Hovian, Armenians of Iran (Armanīyān-i Īrān). Tehran: International Center for Dialogue Among Civilizations, in collaboration with Hermes Publishers, 1380 (2001), pp. 111 to 157.] ISBN 964-363-007-2
- کتاب کلیسای قدیم در ایران، نویسنده: ویلیام میلر، برگرداننده: محمد سعیدی [William Miller, Book of the Old Church in Iran, Recited: Mohammad Saeedi.]
- کلیساهای ارامنه ایران، مؤلف: لینا ملکمیان، چاپ دوم، زمستان۱۳۸۰ دفتر پژوهشهای فرهنگی [Lina Malcolmian, Churches of Armenians in Iran, Second Edition, Winter 2001, Office of Cultural Studies.]
- مروری بر کلیساهای ارامنهٔ استان آذربایجان شرقی، نویسنده: نادره شجاع دل، فصلنامه فرهنگی پیمان - شماره ۳۴ - سال نهم - زمستان ۱۳۸۴ [Nadereh Shoja Dahl, A Review of Armenian Churches in East Azarbaijan. Peyman Cultural Journal, 1384 (2005), p. 34.]
- بررسی سیر معماری کلیسای مریم مقدس تبریز، نویسنده: آرموند سیمونیانس، فصلنامه فرهنگی پیمان - شماره ۶۶ - سال هفدهم - زمستان ۱۳۹۲ [Armand Simonianz, The study of the architecture of the Church of Mary Magdalene in Tabriz. Peyman Cultural Journal, 1392 (2013), p. 66.]
- دانشنامه ایرانیان ارمنی، نویسنده: ژانت د. لازاریان،انتشارات هیرمند، چاپ دوم:۱۳۸۸، شابک:۰-۵۰-۶۹۷۴-۹۶۴-۹۷۸ [Janet D. Lazarian: Encyclopedia of Iranian Armenians. Hirmand Publication, Second Edition 2009], ISBN 9789646974500.

== See also ==
- Iranian Armenians
- List of Armenian churches in Iran
- Shoghakat Church of Tabriz
- Saint Sargis Church of Tabriz
