= Armenian Prelacy of Atrpatakan =

Holy See of Cilicia

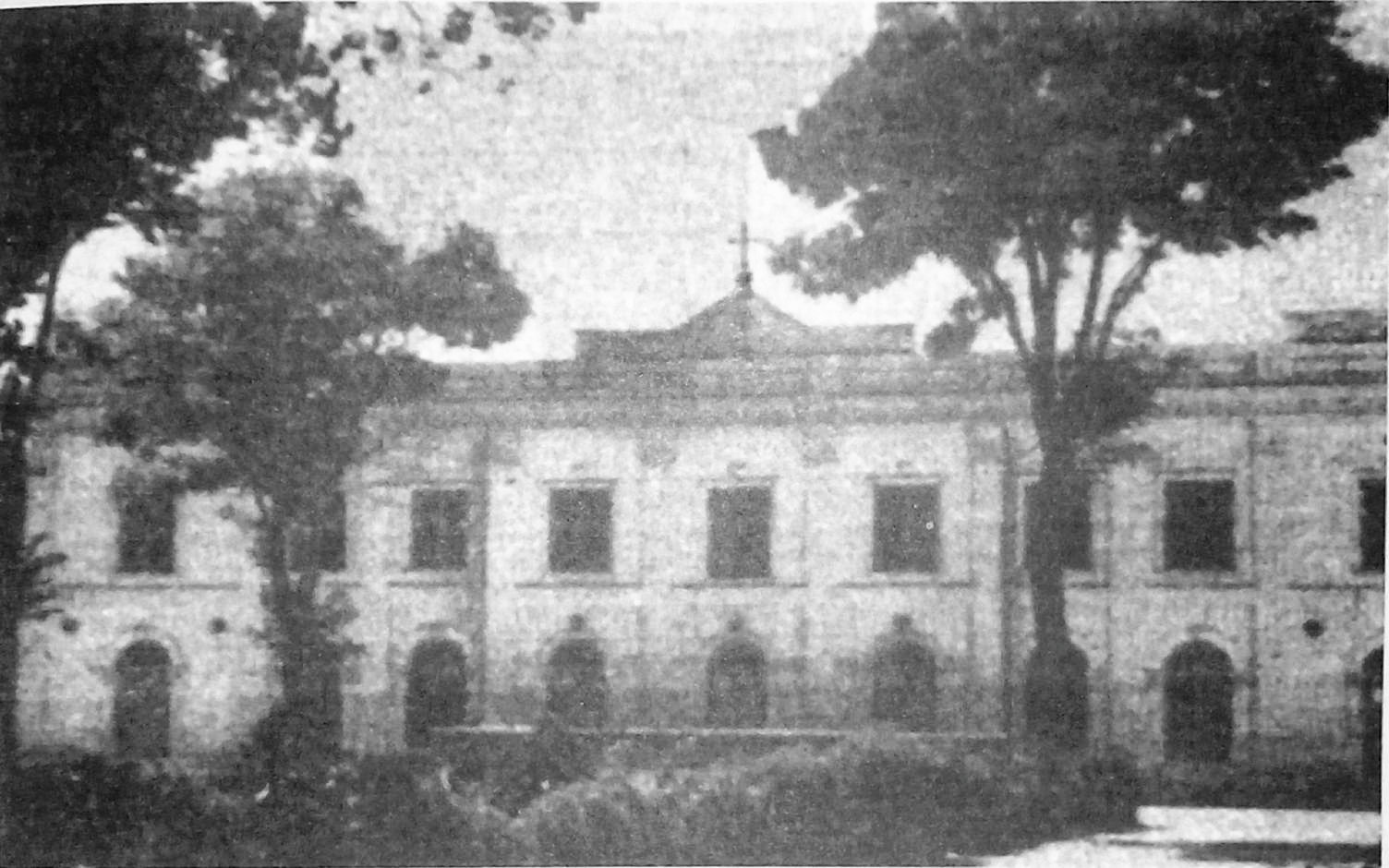
- Building of Diocese of Atrpatakan in Tabriz.

Location
- Country: Iran
- Territory: Atrpatakan
- Coordinates: 38.0718286°N 46.28636867°E

Information
- Denomination: Armenian Apostolic
- Cathedral: St. Mary Church, Tabriz, Iran

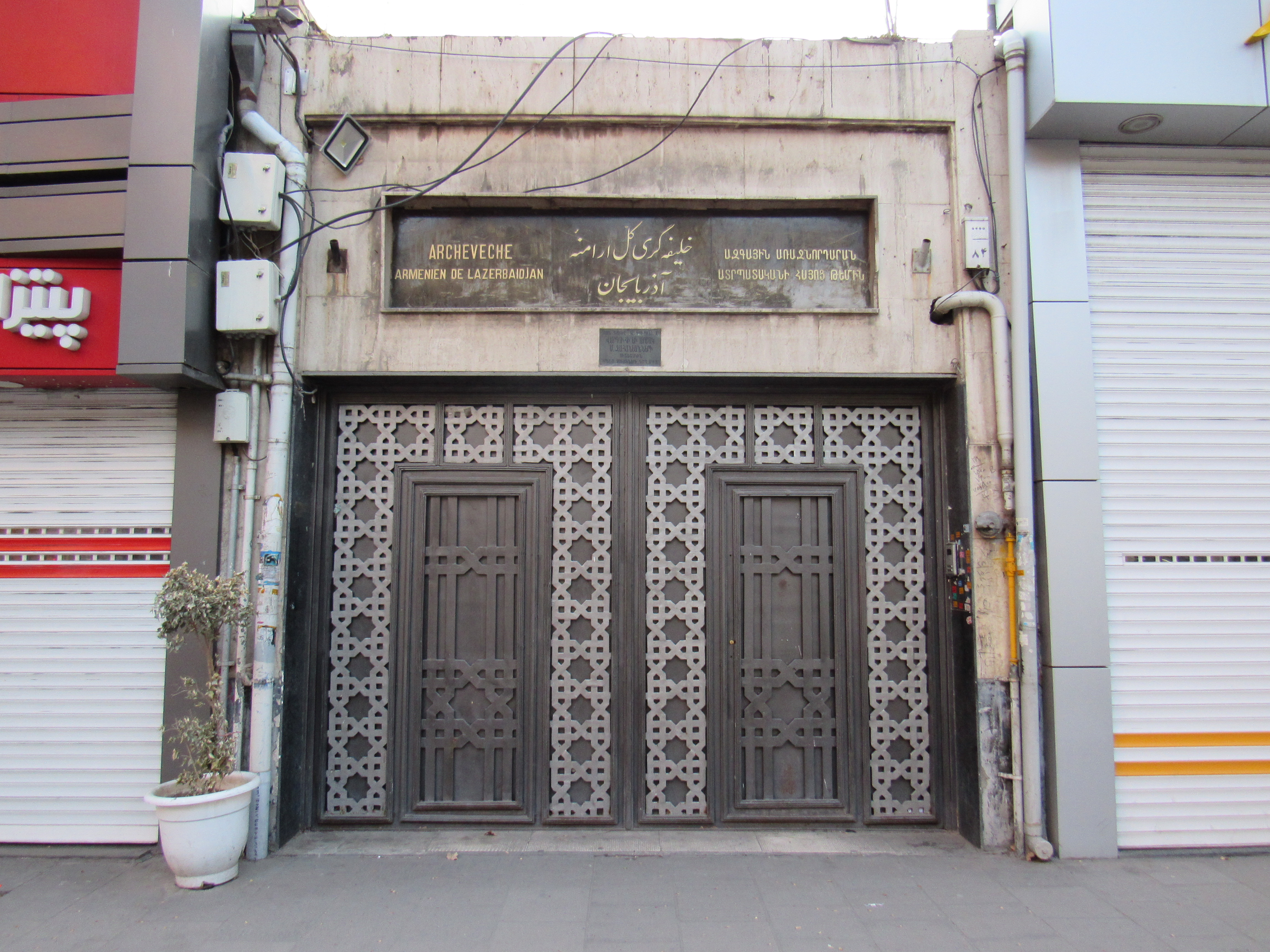
Entrance to the building of Diocese of Atrpatakan in Tabriz.

Armenian Diocese of Atrpatakan (Armenian: Ատրպատականի հայոց թեմ ; Persian: خلیفه‌گری ارامنه آذربایجان), also known as the Diocese of Tabriz, is an Oriental Orthodox Christian diocese (or eparchy) of the Armenian Apostolic Church in Tabriz, Azerbaijan, Iran. It is within the ecclesiastical jurisdiction of the Catholicossate of the Great House of Cilicia having operated under its authority since 1956 after previously being affiliated with the Mother See of Holy Etchmiadzin. Originally centered at the Monastery of Saint Thaddeus in Maku, the diocese relocated its administrative headquarters to Tabriz in 1833 following the Treaty of Turkmenchay. Currently, its jurisdiction including the provinces of East Azerbaijan, West Azerbaijan, and Ardabilacross 57 churches under the leadership of Archbishop Grigor Chiftjian.

== Description ==
The Iranian Armenian has three diocese which is Armenian Diocese of Atrpatakan, centered in Tabriz; Armenian Prelacy of Isfahan, centered in Isfahan, and the Armenian Prelacy of Tehran, centered in Tehran. Armenian Diocese of Atrpatakan is the oldest diocese from of the three dioceses. Before 1883, it was known as Diocese of Atropatene with its center at the Monastery of Saint Thaddeus in Maku. Following the Treaty of Turkmenchay, the center was relocated to Tabriz, as the Monastery of Saint Thaddeus is located near the Russo-Persian border and was renamed as the Diocese of Tabriz. After its relocation to Tabriz, the diocese was housed in the courtyard of Saint Mary Church of Tabriz until 1936. Then, it moved to the building of the Armenian School on Shariati Street in the southern Tabriz.

The Armenian Prelacy of Atrpatakan was affiliated with Mother See of Holy Etchmiadzin until 1956, when it became independent ecclesiastical polity under the Holy See of Cilicia. Its jurisdiction including the provinces of East Azerbaijan, West Azerbaijan, and Ardabil serving a population of approximately 5,000 people, a decrease from the 10,000 people who lived in Tabriz alone prior to 1970. The diocese have 57 churches and is led by Archbishop Grigor Chiftjian alongside a representative assembly elected every three years, which forms the diocesan council.

== See also ==
- Armenians in Iran
