= Nader Mirza Qajar =

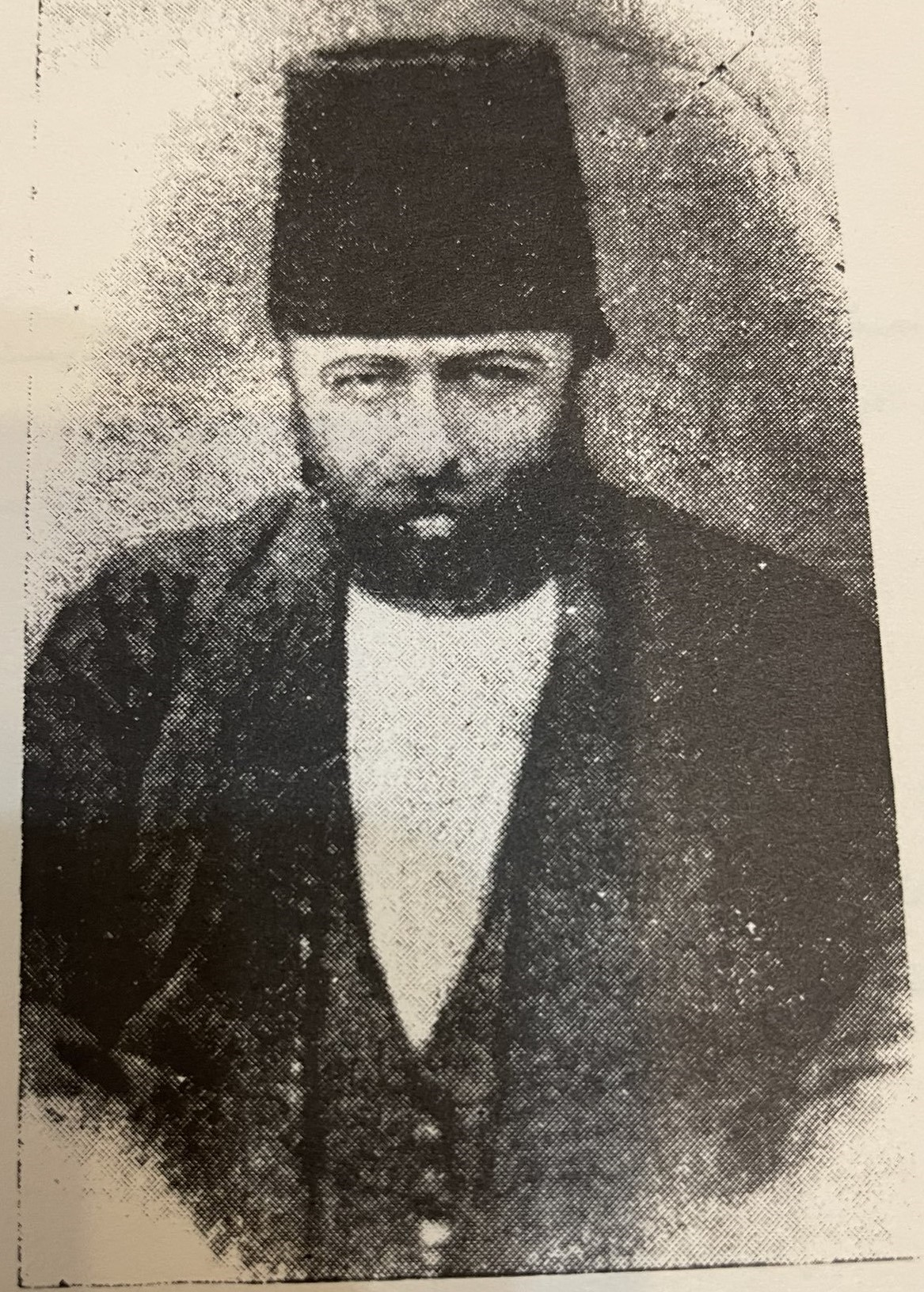
Photograph of Nader Mirza Qajar

Nader Mirza Qajar (Persian: نادر میرزا قاجار; died 1885) was a historian in 19th-century Qajar Iran, who composed the Persian historical chronicle Tarikh va joghrafi-ye Dar al-Saltaneh-ye Tabriz in 1884.

== Sources ==
- Chelongar, Mohammad Ali; Hoseini, Sajjad (2013). "The historiography of Nader Mirza Qajar". Journal of Historical Researches (in Persian). 5 (3): 17–40.
- Werner, Christoph (2000). "The Amazon, the Sources of the Nile, and Tabriz: Nadir Mirza's Tārīkh va jughrāfī-yi dār al-salṭana-yi Tabrīz and the Local Historiography of Tabriz and Azerbaijan". Iranian Studies. 33 (1/2). Cambridge University Press: 165–184. doi:10.1080/00210860008701980. JSTOR 4311338. (registration required)
