= Fereydan =

Region of Isfahan Province, Iran

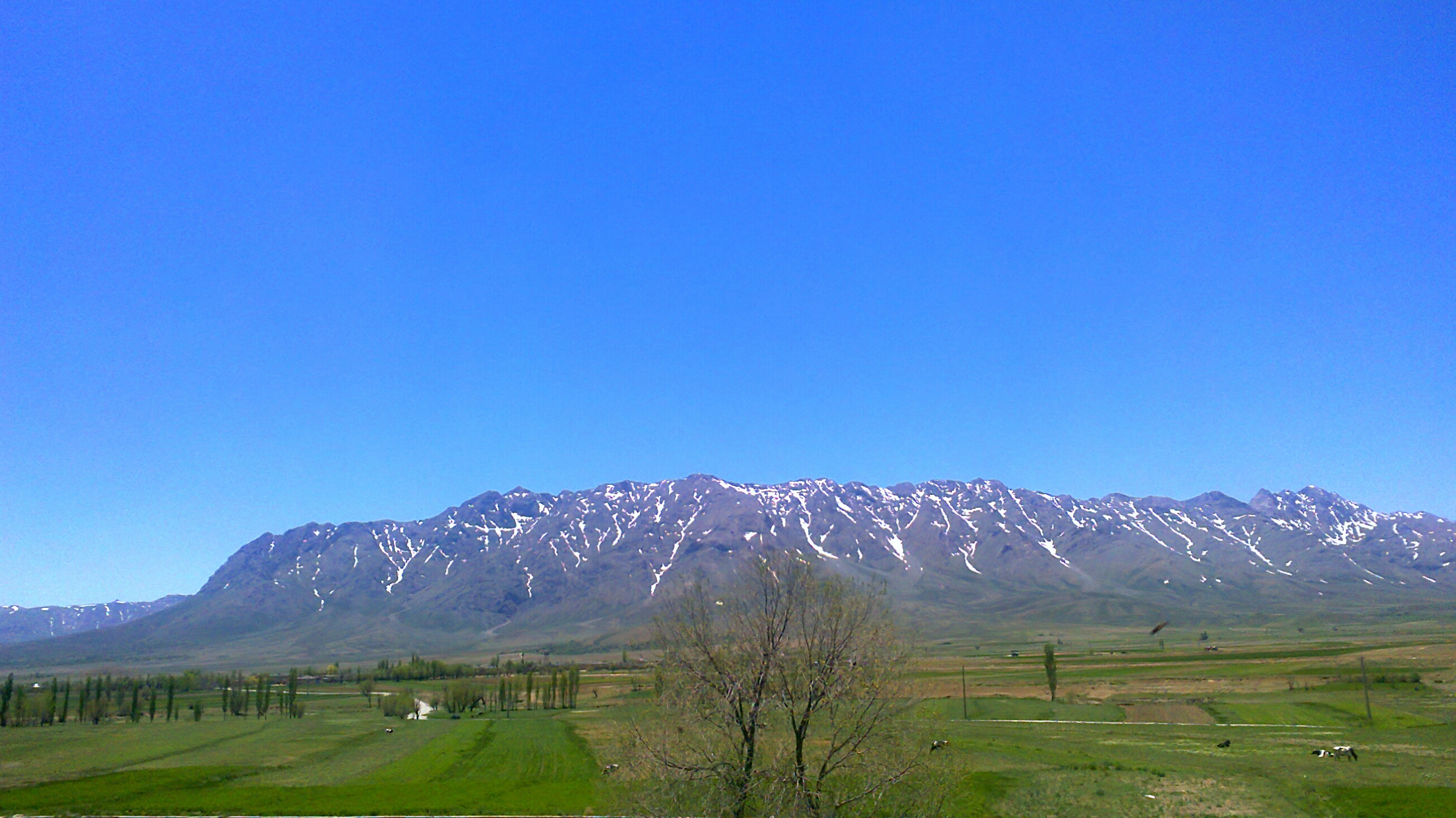
Fereydan

Fereydan (Persian: فریدن; Georgian: ფერეიდანი; Armenian: Փերիա) is a region of Isfahan Province, Iran.

== Demographics ==
=== Georgians ===
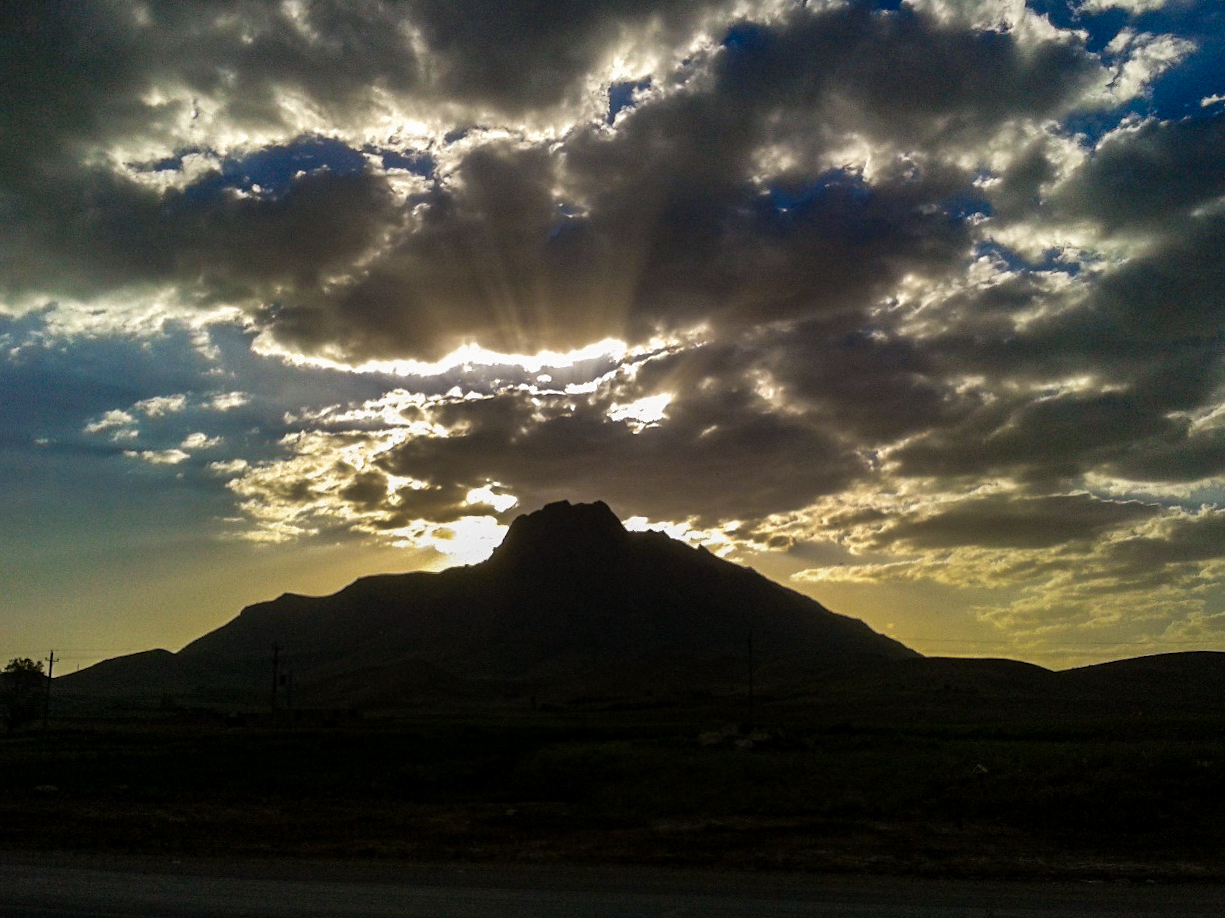
The mountain that stands like a wall between the Georgians of Fereydan (Fereydunshahr, Sibak, Choqyurt and Nehzatabad) in the south and those of Buin va Miandasht, Afus, Dashkasan and Aghche in the north

The Fereydan Georgians (Georgian: ფერეიდნელები) are an ethnic subgroup of the Georgian people who live mostly in the city of Fereydunshahr and in the Fereydan region of Iran.

==== Origins ====
Although there have been Georgian migrations into Iran - sometimes voluntary, but mainly forced - since the time of shah Tahmasp I, the presence of a large Georgian community in Iran dates mainly from the reign of shah Abbas I. During the Persian punitive campaign undertaken in eastern Georgia by Shah Abbas in 1614–17 against his (formerly most loyal) Georgian subject Teimuraz I, both the region of Kakheti and the city of Tbilisi were devastated, and a large part of the population forced into exile. Soon after the triumphal return of Shah Abbas to Persia in 1617 following his Georgian campaign, some 200,000 ethnic Georgians from Kakheti were banished to Isfahan province, Fereydan county, and other regions in mainland Persia, such as in the north (present day Mazandaran province, Gilan province). Under forced labour, Georgians constructed bridges and organized the improvement of the farmlands of the Fereydan valley. After their forced migration, Persianization, and islamisation, few of the Fereydan Georgians were able to maintain any contact with their motherland. They did, however manage to retain their mother tongue, the Georgian language, which, to this day, they call Pereidnuli (and which is mutually intelligible with East Georgian dialects). Today, the number of Fereydan Georgians exceeds 100,000 individuals, while the total number of Iranian Georgians in the country as a whole (to say nothing of Iranians claiming Georgian ancestry) constitutes a far greater number, running into the millions - the result of successive waves of Georgian migration occurring between the 16th and 19th centuries.

Georgians are natives in:

Fereydunshahr County

1. Fereydunshahr (Georgian city, County Center)
2. Sibak
3. Choqyurt (Georgian and Luri village)
4. Nehzatabad (Georgian and Luri village)
5. Sadeqiyeh
6. Mila Gerd

Buin va Miandasht County

1. Buin va Miandasht (Georgian city, County Center)
2. Afus
3. Dashkasan
4. Aghche

Fereydan County

1. Qudjanak
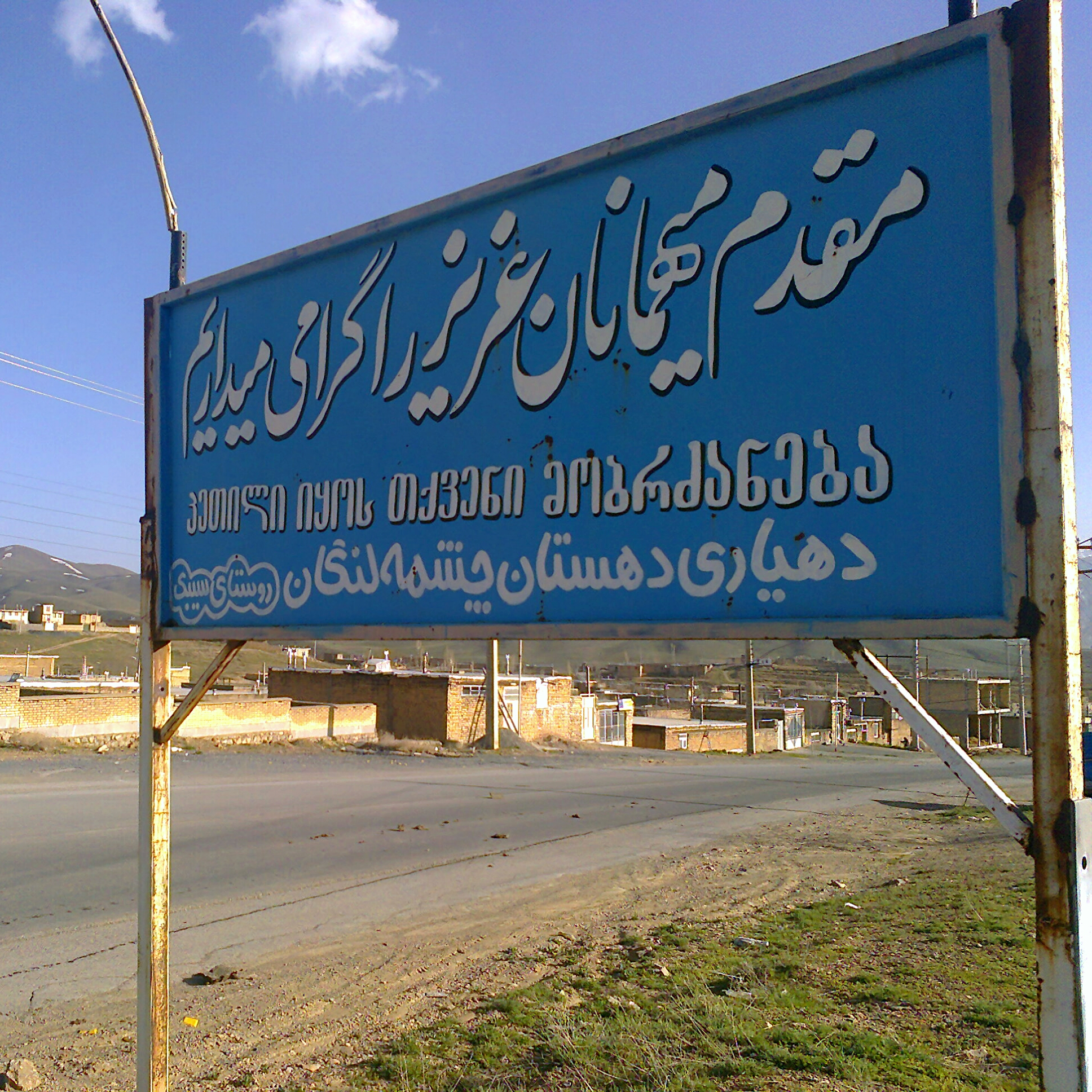

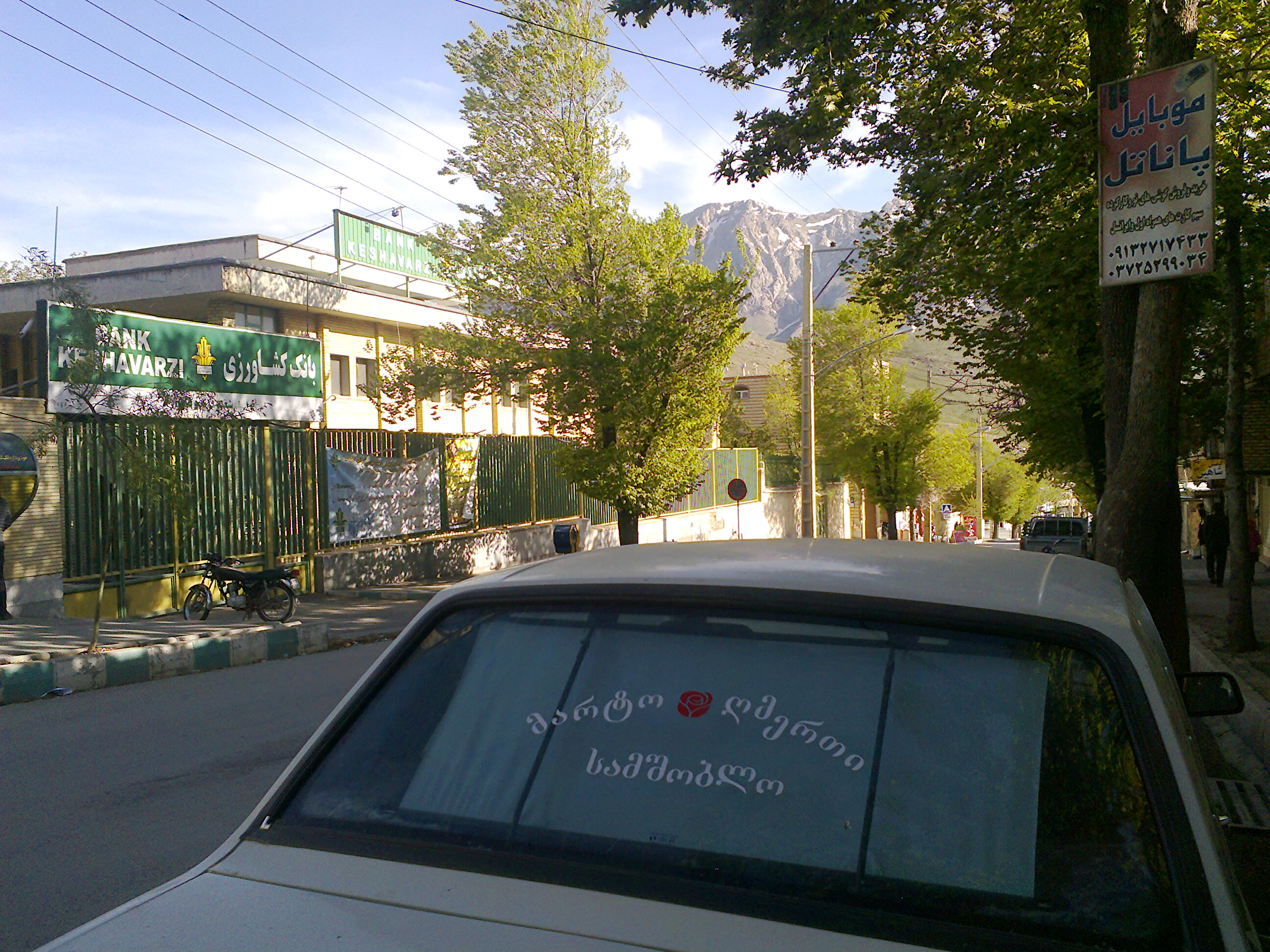

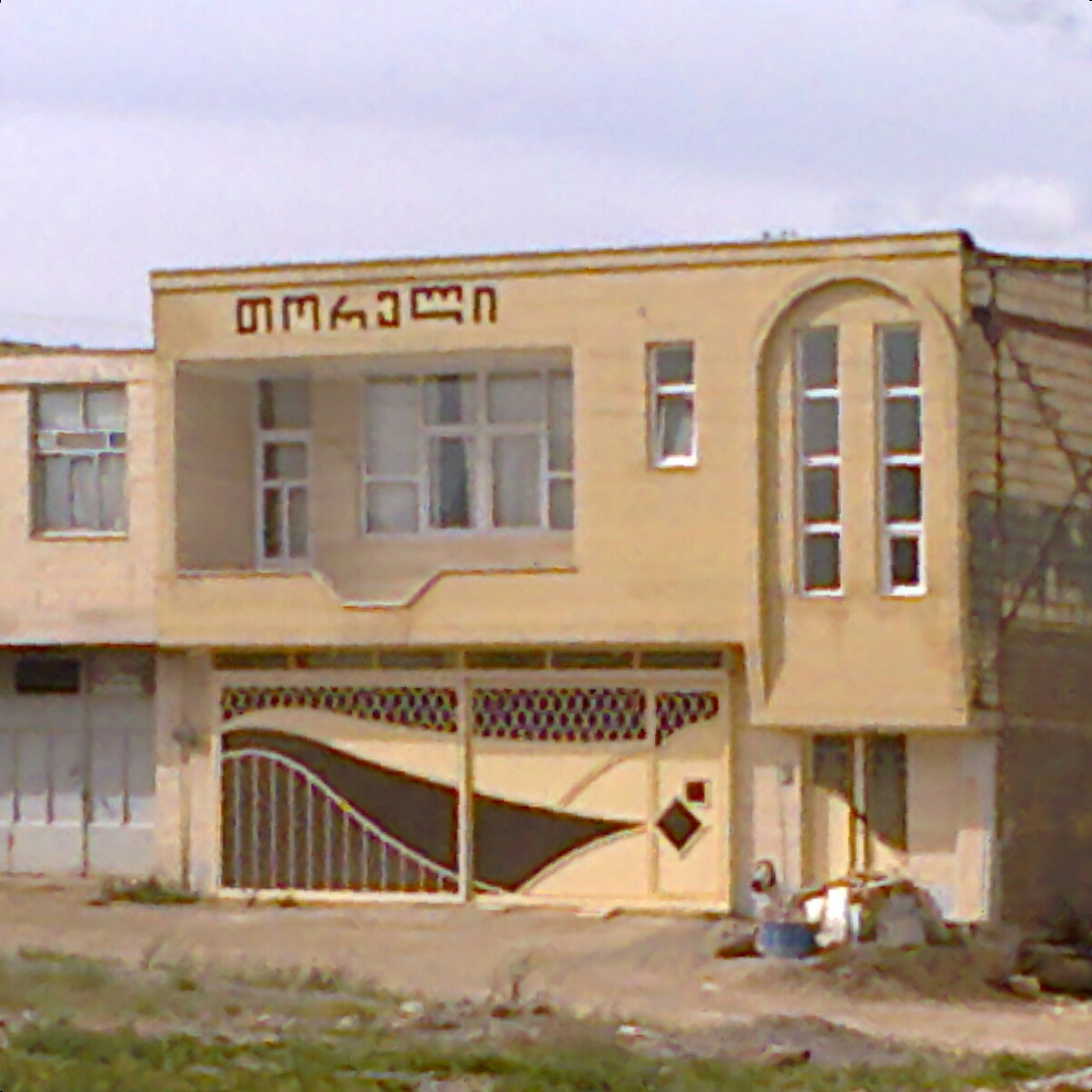

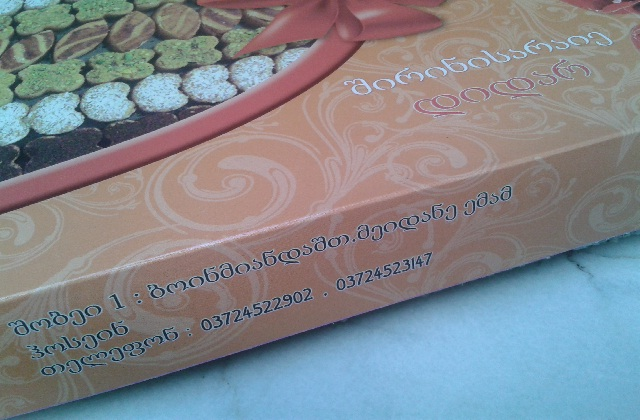

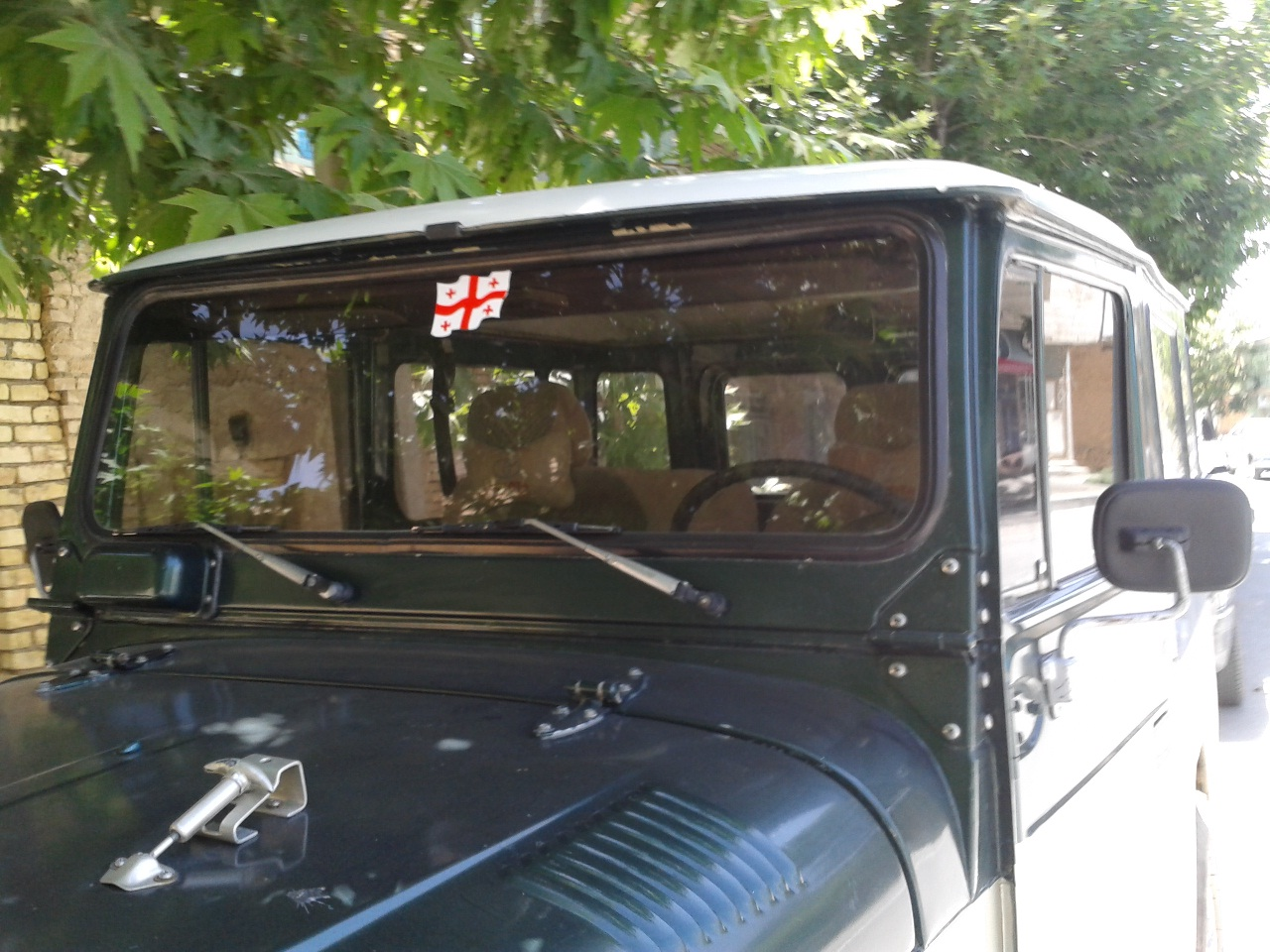

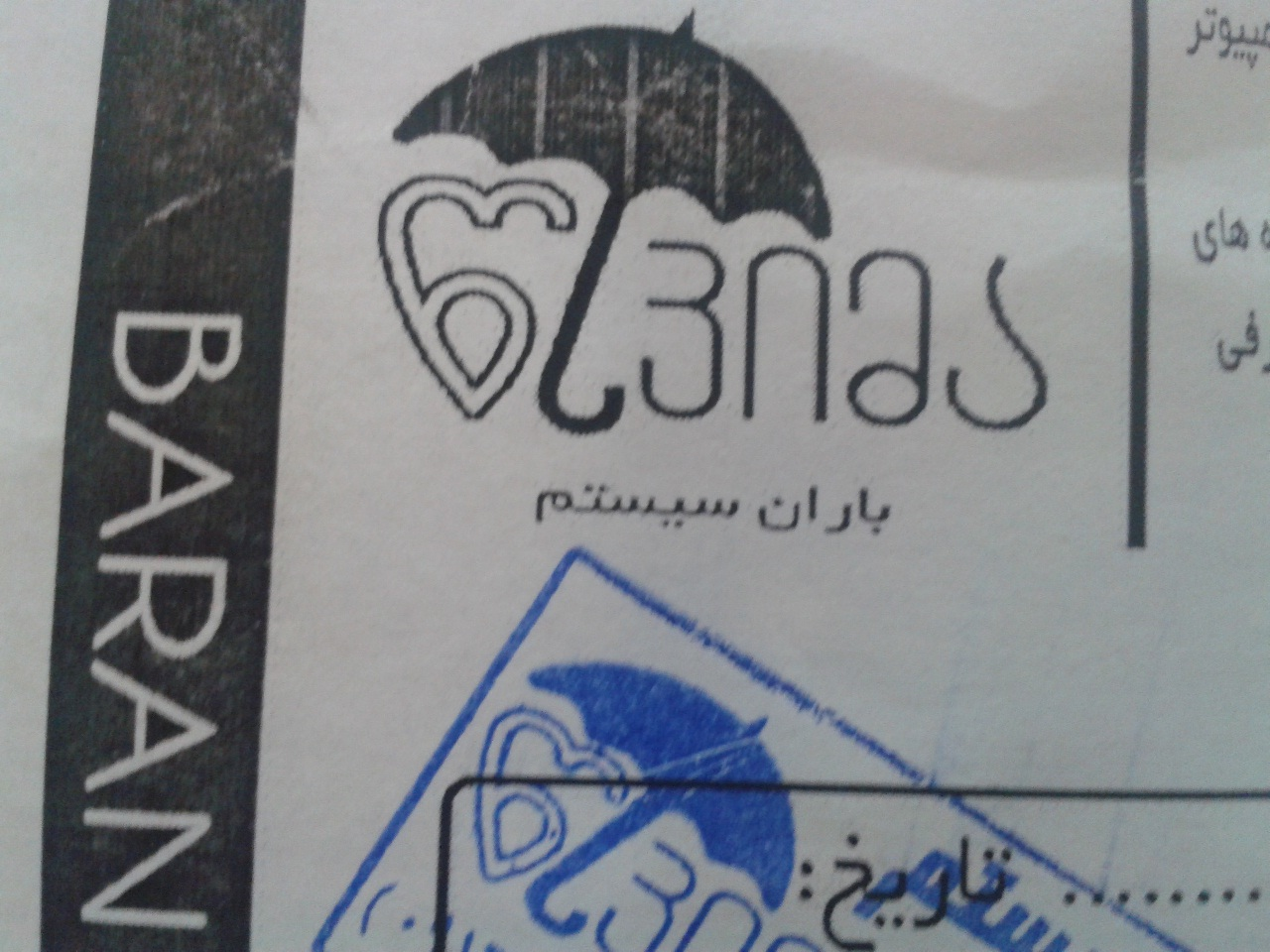

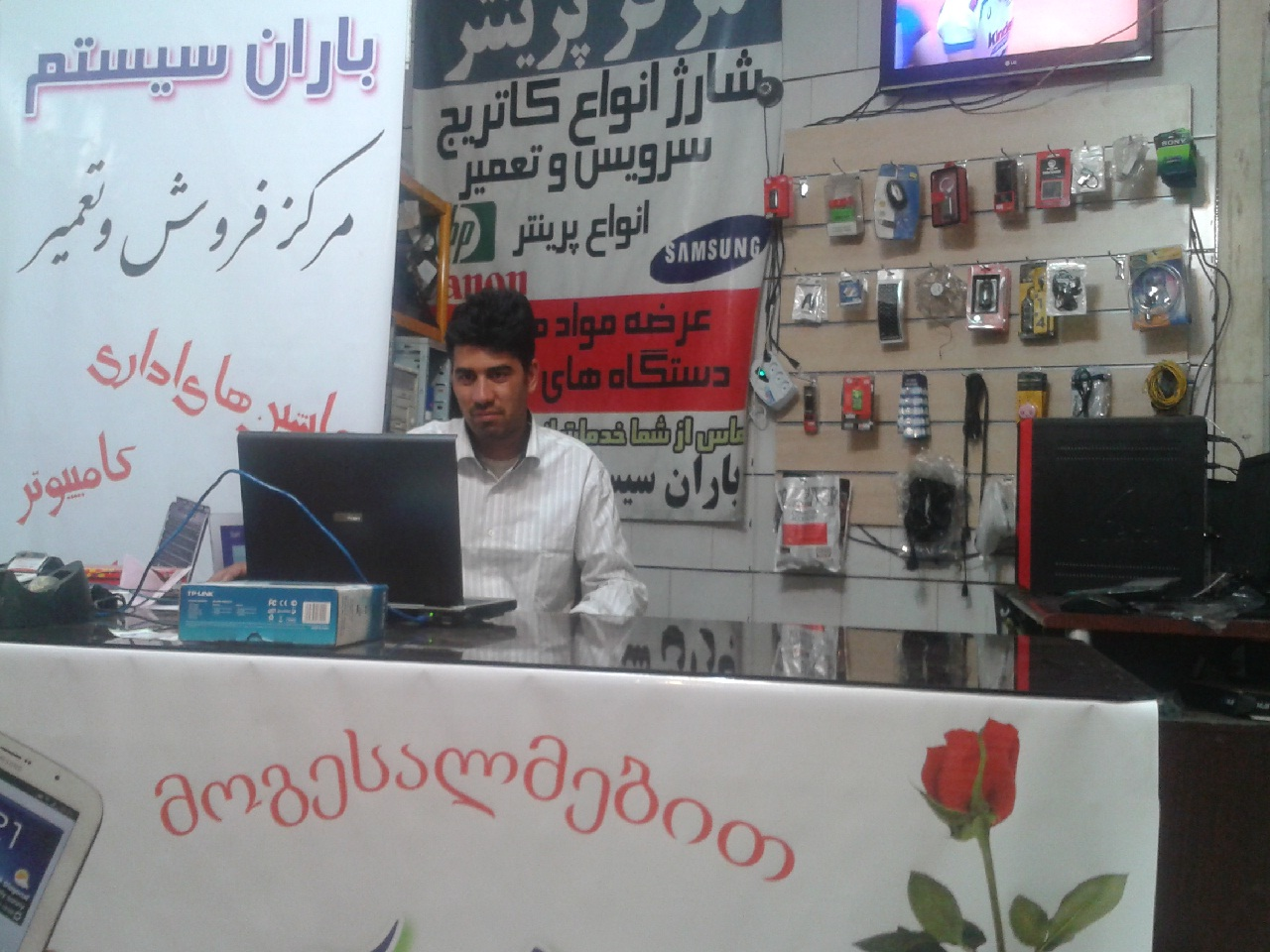

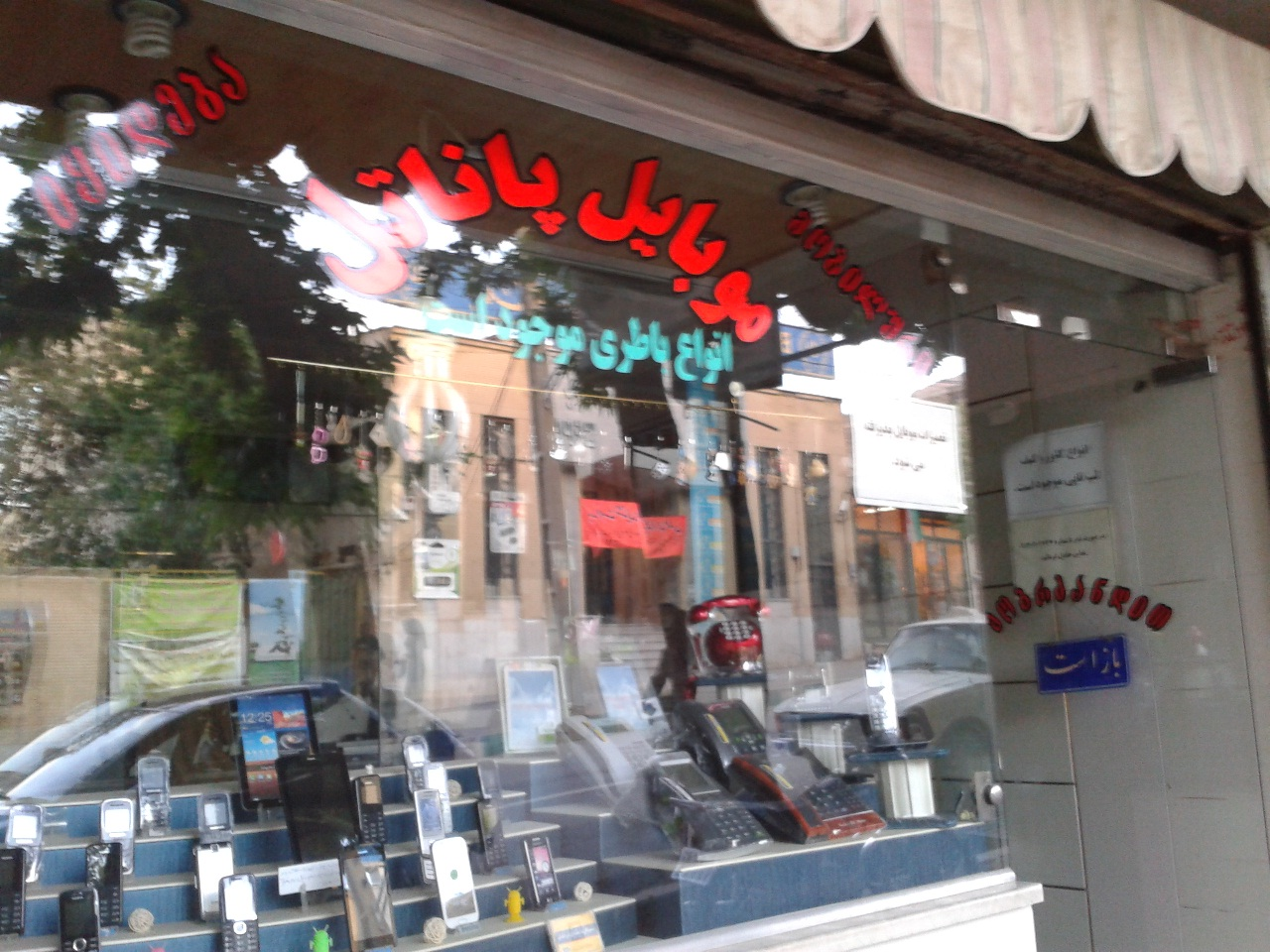

=== Armenians ===
Fereydan (or Peria) was and still is populated by Armenians who were brought to this part of Iran by Shah Abbas of Safavid dynasty in 1603 and 1604, following the Nakhchivan deportations. The population of Iranian Armenians in the region has considerably declined in modernity.

The following is a list of villages historically inhabited by Armenians, which were or are a part of Fereydan:

Fereydunshahr County

1. Barf Anbar
2. Sadeqiyeh
3. Mila Gerd
4. Soroushjan
5. Khuygan-e Olya (Armenian, Turkish and Luri village)

Buin va Miandasht County

1. Zarne (a.k.a. Boloran, presently populated by Armenians)
2. Hadan
3. Hezar Jarib

Fereydan County

1. Khuygan-e Sofla
2. Chigan
3. Derakhtak
4. Gharghan
5. Nemagerd
6. Singerd
7. Savaran

=== Turks ===
The Turks of Fereydan were linguistically and religiously close to Azerbaijanis, speaking a similar Turkic language and also following Shia Islam. They lived near the Armenian, Georgian, Persian (Khwansari), and Bakhtiari communities. They spoke an Oghuz dialect.

== Fereydan's Cultural Heritage ==
More than 340 historical sites have been discovered in Fereydan County, 10 of which have been registered on the national heritage list. On Jan. 3, the Head of Cultural Heritage of Fereydan County announced the discovery of an underground city at the foot of Fereydan which belongs to the Achaemenid era.

== See also ==
- History of Armenia
- History of Georgia
- Bourvari
- Kakheti
- Shurishkan Gospel
