= Chehel Khaneh =

Village in Isfahan province, Iran

Chehel Khaneh Persian: چهل خانه
- Village
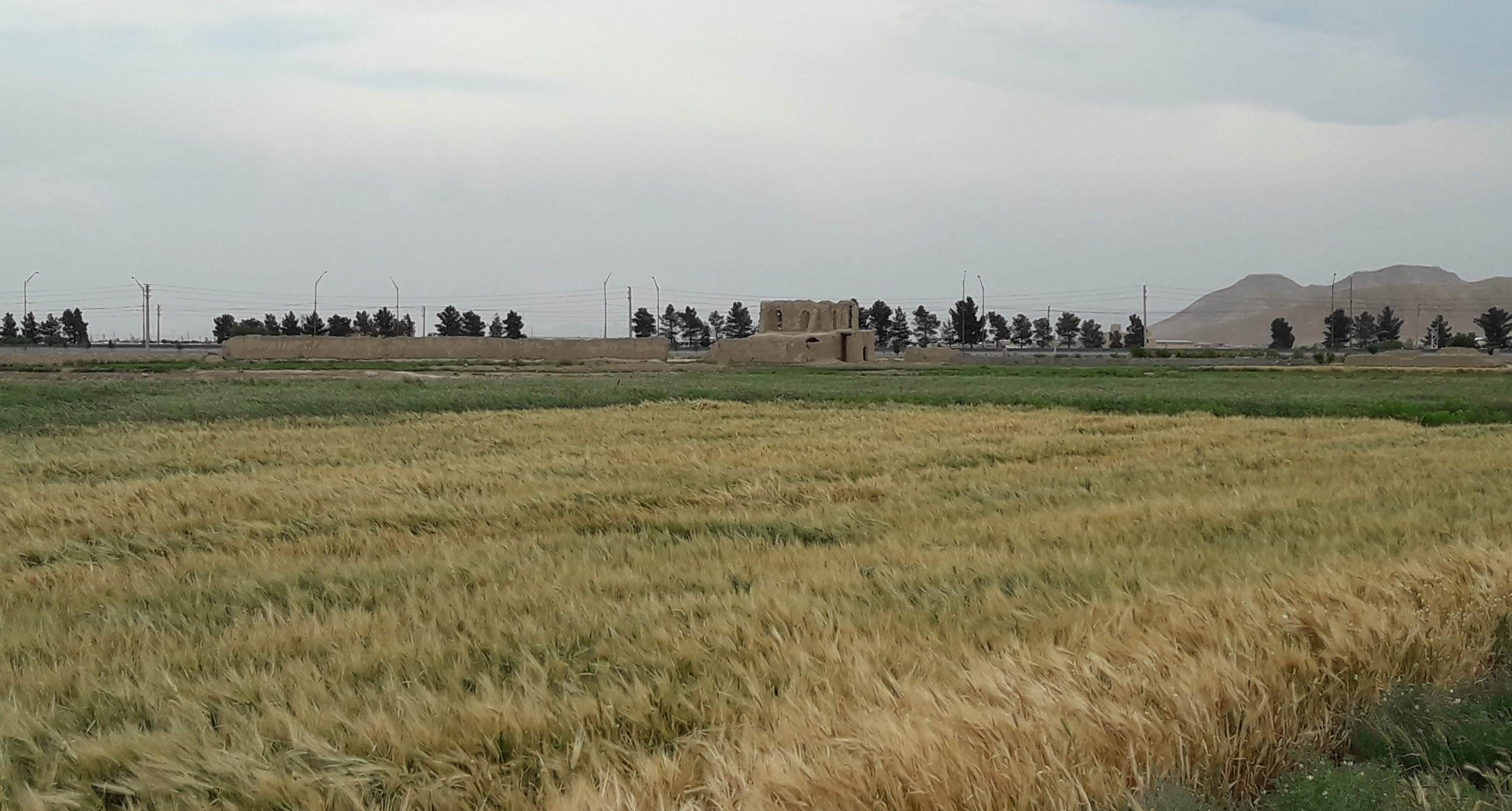
- Chehel Khaneh

- Location within Iran
- Coordinates: 33°02′45″N 50°18′04″E
- Country: Iran
- Province: Isfahan
- County: Faridan
- District: Zendehrud
- Rural District: Qarah Bisheh

Population (2016)
  - Total: 2,533
- Time zone: UTC+3:30 (IRST)

Chehel Khaneh (Persian: چهل خانه) (Note: Also romanized as Chehel Khāneh; also known as Chehil Khāneh, Chehl Khāni, Chel Khāneh, and Khūnīn) is a village in, and the capital of, Qarah Bisheh Rural District in Zendehrud District of Faridan County, Isfahan province, Iran.

== Demographics ==
=== Population ===
At the time of the 2006 National Census, the village's population was 2,728 in 730 households, when it was in Varzaq Rural District of the Central District. The following census in 2011 counted 2,856 people in 882 households. The 2016 census measured the population of the village as 2,533 people in 804 households, by which time the rural district had been separated from the district in the formation of Zendehrud District. The village was transferred to Qarah Bisheh Rural District created in the new district. Chehel Khaneh was the most populous village in its rural district.
