= Hasur, Iran =

Village in Isfahan province, Iran

Hasur Persian: حصور
- Village
- Location within Iran
- Coordinates: 33°00′25″N 50°18′57″E
- Country: Iran
- Province: Isfahan
- County: Faridan
- District: Zendehrud
- Rural District: Qarah Bisheh

Population (2016)
  - Total: 325
- Time zone: UTC+3:30 (IRST)

Hasur (Persian: حصور) (Note: Also romanized as Hasoor, Ḩaşūr, and Hoşūr) is a village in Qarah Bisheh Rural District of Zendehrud District in Faridan County, Isfahan province, Iran.

== Demographics ==
=== Population ===
At the time of the 2006 National Census, the village's population was 501 in 120 households, when it was in Varzaq Rural District of the Central District. The following census in 2011 counted 400 people in 104 households. The 2016 census measured the population of the village as 325 people in 103 households, by which time the rural district had been separated from the district in the formation of Zendehrud District. The village was transferred to Qarah Bisheh Rural District created in the new district.
