= Ganjeh, Isfahan =

Village in Isfahan province, Iran

Ganjeh Persian: گنجه
- Village
- Location within Iran
- Coordinates: 33°01′30″N 50°20′00″E
- Country: Iran
- Province: Isfahan
- County: Faridan
- District: Zendehrud
- Rural District: Qarah Bisheh

Population (2016)
  - Total: 891
- Time zone: UTC+3:30 (IRST)

Ganjeh (Persian: گنجه) is a village in Qarah Bisheh Rural District of Zendehrud District in Faridan County, Isfahan province, Iran.

== Demographics ==
=== Population ===
At the time of the 2006 National Census, the village's population was 1,146 in 293 households, when it was in Varzaq Rural District of the Central District. The following census in 2011 counted 1,084 people in 312 households. The 2016 census measured the population of the village as 891 people in 284 households, by which time the rural district had been separated from the district in the formation of Zendehrud District. The village was transferred to Qarah Bisheh Rural District created in the new district.
