= Quhak =

Village in Isfahan province, Iran

Quhak Persian: قوهك
- Village
- Location within Iran
- Coordinates: 33°05′49″N 50°19′17″E
- Country: Iran
- Province: Isfahan
- County: Faridan
- District: Zendehrud
- Rural District: Qarah Bisheh

Population (2016)
  - Total: 178
- Time zone: UTC+3:30 (IRST)

Quhak (Persian: قوهك) (Note: Also romanized as Qūhak; also known as Ghoohak and Kūhak) is a village in Qarah Bisheh Rural District of Zendehrud District in Faridan County, Isfahan province, Iran.

== Demographics ==
=== Population ===
At the time of the 2006 National Census, the village's population was 342 in 114 households, when it was in Varzaq Rural District of the Central District. The following census in 2011 counted 253 people in 75 households. The 2016 census measured the population of the village as 178 people in 61 households, by which time the rural district had been separated from the district in the formation of Zendehrud District. The village was transferred to Qarah Bisheh Rural District created in the new district.
