= Ozun Bolagh =

Village in Isfahan province, Iran

Ozun Bolagh Persian: اوزان بلاغ
- Village
- Location within Iran
- Coordinates: 33°01′50″N 50°13′39″E
- Country: Iran
- Province: Isfahan
- County: Faridan
- District: Zendehrud
- Rural District: Qarah Bisheh

Population (2016)
  - Total: 1,137
- Time zone: UTC+3:30 (IRST)

Ozun Bolagh (Persian: ازون بلاغ) (Note: Also romanized as Ozoon Bolagh and Ozūn Bolāgh; also known as Owzūn Bolāgh, Owzūq Bolāgh, and Ūzūn Bolāgh) is a village in Qarah Bisheh Rural District of Zendehrud District in Faridan County, Isfahan province, Iran.

== Demographics ==
=== Population ===
At the time of the 2006 National Census, the village's population was 1,363 in 359 households, when it was in Varzaq Rural District of the Central District. The following census in 2011 counted 1,329 people in 403 households. The 2016 census measured the population of the village as 1,137 people in 418 households, by which time the rural district had been separated from the district in the formation of Zendehrud District. The village was transferred to Qarah Bisheh Rural District created in the new district.
