= Badjan, Faridan =

Village in Isfahan province, Iran

Badjan Persian: بادجان
- Village
- Location within Iran
- Coordinates: 33°03′26″N 50°20′59″E
- Country: Iran
- Province: Isfahan
- County: Faridan
- District: Zendehrud
- Rural District: Qarah Bisheh

Population (2016)
  - Total: 2,258
- Time zone: UTC+3:30 (IRST)

Badjan (Persian: بادجان) (Note: Also romanized as Bādejān and Bādjān; also known as Bādejān-e Varzaq, Bādgūn, Bādījān, and Bādjān-e Varzaq) is a village in Qarah Bisheh Rural District of Zendehrud District in Faridan County, Isfahan province, Iran.

== Demographics ==
=== Population ===
At the time of the 2006 National Census, the village's population was 2,251 in 582 households, when it was in Varzaq Rural District of the Central District. The following census in 2011 counted 2,362 people in 707 households. The 2016 census measured the population of the village as 2,258 people in 692 households, by which time the rural district had been separated from the district in the formation of Zendehrud District. The village was transferred to Qarah Bisheh Rural District created in the new district.
