= Derakhtak =

Village in Isfahan province, Iran

Derakhtak Persian: درختك
- Village
- Location within Iran
- Coordinates: 32°56′12″N 50°19′01″E
- Country: Iran
- Province: Isfahan
- County: Faridan
- District: Zendehrud
- Rural District: Varzaq

Population (2016)
  - Total: 380
- Time zone: UTC+3:30 (IRST)

Derakhtak (Persian: درختك) (Note: Also romanized as Darakhtak) is a village in, and the capital of, Varzaq Rural District in Zendehrud District of Faridan County, Isfahan province, Iran. The previous capital of the rural district was the village of Nahr-e Khalaj, now in Qarah Bisheh Rural District.

== Demographics ==
=== Population ===
At the time of the 2006 National Census, the village's population was 392 in 92 households, when it was in the Central District. The following census in 2011 counted 378 people in 90 households. The 2016 census measured the population of the village as 380 people in 110 households, by which time the rural district had been separated from the district in the formation of Zendehrud District.
