= Nahr-e Khalaj =

Village in Isfahan province, Iran

Nahr-e Khalaj Persian: نهرخلج
- Village
- Location within Iran
- Coordinates: 32°59′34″N 50°19′54″E
- Country: Iran
- Province: Isfahan
- County: Faridan
- District: Zendehrud
- Rural District: Qarah Bisheh

Population (2016)
  - Total: 2,220
- Time zone: UTC+3:30 (IRST)

Nahr-e Khalaj (Persian: نهرخلج) (Note: Also romanized as Nahr Khalaj; also known as Nahr Kalāch) is a village in Qarah Bisheh Rural District of Zendehrud District in Faridan County, Isfahan province, Iran, serving as capital of the district. It was the capital of Varzaq Rural District until its capital was transferred to the village of Derakhtak.

== Demographics ==
=== Population ===
At the time of the 2006 National Census, the village's population was 2,584 in 639 households, when it was in Varzaq Rural District of the Central District. The following census in 2011 counted 2,616 people in 700 households. The 2016 census measured the population of the village as 2,220 people in 678 households, by which time the rural district had been separated from the district in the formation of Zendehrud District. Nahr-e Khalaj was transferred to Qarah Bisheh Rural District created in the new district.
