= Dehaq, Faridan =

Village in Isfahan province, Iran

Dehaq Persian: دهق
- Village
- Location within Iran
- Coordinates: 32°54′28″N 50°17′26″E
- Country: Iran
- Province: Isfahan
- County: Faridan
- District: Zendeh Rud
- Rural District: Varzaq

Population (2016)
  - Total: 630
- Time zone: UTC+3:30 (IRST)

Dehaq (Persian: دهق) (Note: Also known as Dehaq-e Fereydan, Doha, and Dowheh) is a village in Varzaq Rural District of Zendeh Rud District in Faridan County, Isfahan province, Iran.

== Demographics ==
=== Population ===
At the time of the 2006 National Census, the village's population was 822 in 201 households, when it was in the Central District. The following census in 2011 counted 569 people in 167 households. The 2016 census measured the population of the village as 630 people in 209 households, by which time the rural district had been separated from the district in the formation of Zendehrud District. Dehaq was the most populous village in its rural district.
