= Badjan (disambiguation) =

Badjan is a village in Iran. Badjan may also refer to:

== People ==
- Janet Badjan-Young (born 1937), Gambian playwright
- Seydou Badjan Kanté (born 1981), Ivorian footballer

== Other uses ==
- Badjan, Fereydunshahr, village in Iran
