= Seftejan =

Village in Isfahan province, Iran

Seftejan Persian: سفتجان
- Village
- Location within Iran
- Coordinates: 32°56′23″N 50°21′22″E
- Country: Iran
- Province: Isfahan
- County: Faridan
- District: Central
- Rural District: Varzaq-e Jonubi

Population (2016)
  - Total: 1,474
- Time zone: UTC+3:30 (IRST)

Seftejan (Persian: سفتجان) (Note: Also romanized as Seft Jān and Seftejān; also known as Şefatgūn and Sīfatgūn) is a village in, and the capital of, Varzaq-e Jonubi Rural District in the Central District of Faridan County, Isfahan province, Iran.

== Demographics ==
=== Population ===
At the time of the 2006 National Census, the village's population was 1,996 in 462 households. The following census in 2011 counted 1,850 people in 492 households. The 2016 census measured the population of the village as 1,474 people in 467 households.
