= Dehsur =

Dehsur or Deh Sur or Deh Soor (Persian: ده سور) may refer to:

- Dehsur-e Olya
- Dehsur-e Sofla
