= Qaleh Malek =

Qaleh Malek or Qaleh-ye Malek (Persian: قلعه ملك) may refer to:

- Qaleh Malek, East Azerbaijan
- Qaleh-ye Malek, Isfahan
