= Eskandari-ye Baraftab =

Village in Isfahan province, Iran

Eskandari-ye Baraftab Persian: اسكندري برافتاب
- Village
- Location within Iran
- Coordinates: 32°49′39″N 50°26′12″E
- Country: Iran
- Province: Isfahan
- County: Faridan
- District: Central
- Rural District: Zayandehrud-e Shomali

Population (2016)
  - Total: 1,601
- Time zone: UTC+3:30 (IRST)

Eskandari-ye Baraftab (Persian: اسكندري برافتاب) (Note: Also romanized as Eskandarī-ye Barāftāb; also known as Eskandarī and Īskandarī) is a village in, and the capital of, Zayandehrud-e Shomali Rural District in the Central District of Faridan County, Isfahan province, Iran.

== Demographics ==
=== Population ===
At the time of the 2006 National Census, the village's population was 2,138 in 519 households. The following census in 2011 counted 1,927 people in 607 households. The 2016 census measured the population of the village as 1,601 people in 558 households, the most populous in its rural district.
