= Darreh Bid, Faridan =

Village in Isfahan province, Iran

Darreh Bid Persian: دره‌بید
- Village
- Location within Iran
- Coordinates: 33°04′34″N 50°27′09″E
- Country: Iran
- Province: Isfahan
- County: Faridan
- District: Central
- Rural District: Dalankuh

Population (2016)
  - Total: 2,329
- Time zone: UTC+3:30 (IRST)

Darreh Bid (Persian: دره‌بید) (Note: Also romanized as Darreh Bīd; also known as Darreh Bīd-e Mollā Mīrzā) is a village in Dalankuh Rural District of the Central District in Faridan County, Isfahan province, Iran.

== Demographics ==
=== Population ===
At the time of the 2006 National Census, the village's population was 2,540 in 654 households. The following census in 2011 counted 2,615 people in 776 households. The 2016 census measured the population of the village as 2,329 people in 780 households, the most populous in its rural district.
