= Khuygan =

Khuygan or Khuigan (Persian: خويگان) may refer to:

- Khuygan-e Olya
- Khuygan-e Sofla
