= Tarrar =

Village in Isfahan province, Iran

Tarrar Persian: طرار
- Village
- Location within Iran
- Coordinates: 32°56′23″N 50°27′07″E
- Country: Iran
- Province: Isfahan
- County: Faridan
- District: Central
- Rural District: Dalankuh

Population (2016)
  - Total: 261
- Time zone: UTC+3:30 (IRST)

Tarrar (Persian: طرار) (Note: Also romanized as Ţarrār) is a village in Dalankuh Rural District of the Central District in Faridan County, Isfahan province, Iran.

== Demographics ==
=== Population ===
At the time of the 2006 National Census, the village's population was 477 in 113 households. The following census in 2011 counted 409 people in 113 households. The 2016 census measured the population of the village as 261 people in 92 households.
