= Gol-e Amir =

Village in Isfahan province, Iran

Gol-e Amir Persian: گل امير
- Village
- Location within Iran
- Coordinates: 32°53′01″N 50°26′20″E
- Country: Iran
- Province: Isfahan
- County: Faridan
- District: Central
- Rural District: Zayandehrud-e Shomali

Population (2016)
  - Total: 637
- Time zone: UTC+3:30 (IRST)

Gol-e Amir (Persian: گل امير) (Note: Also romanized as Gol-e Amīr; formerly known as Bolemir (بلمير), also romanized as Bol Amīr and Bolemīr; also known as Boneh Mīr and Bulamīr) is a village in Zayandehrud-e Shomali Rural District of the Central District in Faridan County, Isfahan province, Iran.

== Demographics ==
=== Population ===
At the time of the 2006 National Census, the village's population was 755 in 181 households. The following census in 2011 counted 754 people in 233 households. The 2016 census measured the population of the village as 637 people in 222 households.
