= Qudjanak =

Village in Isfahan province, Iran

Qudjanak Persian: قودجانك
- Village
- Location within Iran
- Coordinates: 32°53′45″N 50°18′08″E
- Country: Iran
- Province: Isfahan
- County: Faridan
- District: Zendeh Rud
- Rural District: Varzaq

Population (2016)
  - Total: 622
- Time zone: UTC+3:30 (IRST)

Qudjanak (Persian: قودجانك) (Note: Also romanized as Qūdjānak; also known as Gowjānak and Kūdanak) is a village in Varzaq Rural District of Zendeh Rud District in Faridan County, Isfahan province, Iran.

== Demographics ==
=== Population ===
At the time of the 2006 National Census, the village's population was 800 in 181 households, when it was part of the Central District. The following census in 2011 counted 582 people in 161 households. The 2016 census measured the population of the village as 622 people in 199 households, by which time the rural district had been separated from the district in the formation of Zendehrud District.
