= Adegan =

Village in Isfahan province, Iran

Adegan Persian: عادگان
- Village
- Location within Iran
- Coordinates: 32°46′23″N 50°26′42″E
- Country: Iran
- Province: Isfahan
- County: Faridan
- District: Central
- Rural District: Zayandehrud-e Shomali

Population (2016)
  - Total: 584
- Time zone: UTC+3:30 (IRST)

Adegan (Persian: عادگان) (Note: Also romanized as ‘Ādegān and Adgān; also known as Adgūn and Adkān) is a village in Zayandehrud-e Shomali Rural District of the Central District in Faridan County, Isfahan province, Iran.

== Demographics ==
=== Population ===
At the time of the 2006 National Census, the village's population was 698 in 167 households. The following census in 2011 counted 603 people in 172 households. The 2016 census measured the population of the village as 584 people in 192 households.
