= Nesar-e Eskandari =

Village in Isfahan province, Iran

Nesar-e Eskandari Persian: نساراسكندري
- Village
- Location within Iran
- Coordinates: 32°49′04″N 50°25′27″E
- Country: Iran
- Province: Isfahan
- County: Faridan
- District: Central
- Rural District: Zayandehrud-e Shomali

Population (2016)
  - Total: 530
- Time zone: UTC+3:30 (IRST)

Nesar-e Eskandari (Persian: نسار اسکندری) (Note: Also romanized as Nesār-e Eskandarī; also known as Eskandarī-ye Nesā‘, Nesār, and Nisār) is a village in Zayandehrud-e Shomali Rural District of the Central District in Faridan County, Isfahan province, Iran.

== Demographics ==
=== Population ===
At the time of the 2006 National Census, the village's population was 682 in 162 households. The following census in 2011 counted 698 people in 205 households. The 2016 census measured the population of the village as 530 people in 163 households.

== Geography ==
The settlement is connected to the nearby locality of Nesar-e Eskandari by the road known as Masir-e Eskandari* (Alexander's Road); this road lies between the heights of Kūh-e Dārābshāh (Mount [[King Darius]]) and the [[Palāsjān River]] which runs along its southern edge.
