= Faridan =

Faridan may refer to:

- Faridan County, an administrative subdivision of Iran
- Daran, Iran, its capital
