= Mughan, Iran =

Village in Isfahan province, Iran

Mughan Persian: موغان
- Village
- Location within Iran
- Coordinates: 32°51′28″N 50°23′05″E
- Country: Iran
- Province: Isfahan
- County: Faridan
- District: Central
- Rural District: Varzaq-e Jonubi

Population (2016)
  - Total: 485
- Time zone: UTC+3:30 (IRST)

Mughan (Persian: موغان) (Note: Also romanized as Mūghān; also known as Moghān and Mūghūn) is a village in Varzaq-e Jonubi Rural District of the Central District in Faridan County, Isfahan province, Iran.

== Demographics ==
=== Population ===
At the time of the 2006 National Census, the village's population was 664 in 159 households. The following census in 2011 counted 573 people in 170 households. The 2016 census measured the population of the village as 485 people in 166 households.
