= Qafar, Iran =

Village in Isfahan province, Iran

Qafar Persian: قفر
- Village
- Location within Iran
- Coordinates: 33°02′47″N 50°26′08″E
- Country: Iran
- Province: Isfahan
- County: Faridan
- District: Central
- Rural District: Dalankuh

Population (2016)
  - Total: 1,063
- Time zone: UTC+3:30 (IRST)

Qafar (Persian: قفر) (Note: Also known as Ghafr) is a village in Dalankuh Rural District of the Central District in Faridan County, Isfahan province, Iran.

== Demographics ==
=== Population ===
At the time of the 2006 National Census, the village's population was 954 in 228 households. The following census in 2011 counted 1,048 people in 307 households. The 2016 census measured the population of the village as 1,063 people in 330 households.
