= Qaleh-ye Malek, Isfahan =

Village in Isfahan province, Iran

Qaleh-ye Malek Persian: قلعه ملک
- Village
- Location within Iran
- Coordinates: 32°52′36″N 50°20′50″E
- Country: Iran
- Province: Isfahan
- County: Faridan
- District: Central
- Rural District: Varzaq-e Jonubi

Population (2016)
  - Total: 189
- Time zone: UTC+3:30 (IRST)

Qaleh-ye Malek (Persian: قلعه ملک) (Note: Also romanized as Qal‘eh-ye Malek; also known as Ghal‘eh Malek) is a village in Varzaq-e Jonubi Rural District of the Central District in Faridan County, Isfahan province, Iran.

== Demographics ==
=== Population ===
At the time of the 2006 National Census, the village's population was 152 in 40 households. The following census in 2011 counted 166 people in 48 households. The 2016 census measured the population of the village as 189 people in 59 households.
