= Savaran, Isfahan =

Village in Isfahan province, Iran

Savaran Persian: سواران
- Village
- Location within Iran
- Coordinates: 32°52′45″N 50°22′10″E
- Country: Iran
- Province: Isfahan
- County: Faridan
- District: Central
- Rural District: Varzaq-e Jonubi

Population (2016)
  - Total: 176
- Time zone: UTC+3:30 (IRST)

Savaran (Persian: سواران) (Note: Also romanized as Savārān and Sawārān) is a village in Varzaq-e Jonubi Rural District of the Central District in Faridan County, Isfahan province, Iran.

== Demographics ==
=== Population ===
At the time of the 2006 National Census, the village's population was 313 in 85 households. The following census in 2011 counted 217 people in 76 households. The 2016 census measured the population of the village as 176 people in 63 households.
