= Nemagerd =

Village in Isfahan province, Iran

Nemagerd Persian: نماگرد
- Village
- Location within Iran
- Coordinates: 32°57′36″N 50°22′28″E
- Country: Iran
- Province: Isfahan
- County: Faridan
- District: Central
- Rural District: Varzaq-e Jonubi

Population (2016)
  - Total: 634
- Time zone: UTC+3:30 (IRST)

Nemagerd (Persian: نماگرد) (Note: Also romanized as Nemāgerd; also known as Namājerd and Nimagird) is a village in Varzaq-e Jonubi Rural District of the Central District in Faridan County, Isfahan province, Iran.

== Demographics ==
=== Population ===
At the time of the 2006 National Census, the village's population was 838 in 198 households. The following census in 2011 counted 796 people in 226 households. The 2016 census measured the population of the village as 634 people in 209 households.
