= Nanadegan =

Village in Isfahan province, Iran

Nanadegan Persian: ننادگان
- Village
- Location within Iran
- Coordinates: 32°50′52″N 50°21′01″E
- Country: Iran
- Province: Isfahan
- County: Faridan
- District: Central
- Rural District: Varzaq-e Jonubi

Population (2016)
  - Total: 1,716
- Time zone: UTC+3:30 (IRST)

Nanadegan (Persian: ننادگان) (Note: Also romanized as Nanādegān and Nanādgan; also known as Naneh Dagūn and Tanādegān) is a village in Varzaq-e Jonubi Rural District of the Central District in Faridan County, Isfahan province, Iran.

== Demographics ==
=== Population ===
At the time of the 2006 National Census, the village's population was 2,085 in 512 households. The following census in 2011 counted 1,906 people in 548 households. The 2016 census measured the population of the village as 1,716 people in 534 households, the most populous in its rural district.
