= Gharghan =

Village in Isfahan province, Iran

Gharghan Persian: غرغن
- Village
- Location within Iran
- Coordinates: 32°54′17″N 50°22′01″E
- Country: Iran
- Province: Isfahan
- County: Faridan
- District: Central
- Rural District: Varzaq-e Jonubi

Population (2016)
  - Total: 524
- Time zone: UTC+3:30 (IRST)

Gharghan (Persian: غرغن) (Note: Also romanized as Gharghen) is a village in Varzaq-e Jonubi Rural District of the Central District in Faridan County, Isfahan province, Iran.

== Demographics ==
=== Population ===
At the time of the 2006 National Census, the village's population was 710 in 181 households. The following census in 2011 counted 599 people in 197 households. The 2016 census measured the population of the village as 524 people in 179 households.
