= Chigan =

Village in Isfahan province, Iran

Chigan Persian: چيگان
- Village
- Location within Iran
- Coordinates: 32°53′53″N 50°20′08″E
- Country: Iran
- Province: Isfahan
- County: Faridan
- District: Central
- Rural District: Varzaq-e Jonubi

Population (2016)
  - Total: 324
- Time zone: UTC+3:30 (IRST)

Chigan (Persian: چيگان) (Note: Also romanized as Chīgān; also known as Chegān and Jīgān) is a village in Varzaq-e Jonubi Rural District of the Central District in Faridan County, Isfahan province, Iran.

== Demographics ==
=== Population ===
At the time of the 2006 National Census, the village's population was 422 in 120 households. The following census in 2011 counted 392 people in 124 households. The 2016 census measured the population of the village as 324 people in 127 households.
