= Singerd =

Village in Isfahan province, Iran

Singerd Persian: سينگرد
- Village
- Location within Iran
- Coordinates: 32°47′20″N 50°26′00″E
- Country: Iran
- Province: Isfahan
- County: Faridan
- District: Central
- Rural District: Zayandehrud-e Shomali

Population (2016)
  - Total: 506
- Time zone: UTC+3:30 (IRST)

Singerd (Persian: سينگرد) (Note: Also romanized as Sīngard and Sīngerd; also known as Sangird) is a village in Zayandehrud-e Shomali Rural District of the Central District in Faridan County, Isfahan province, Iran.

== Demographics ==
=== Population ===
At the time of the 2006 National Census, the village's population was 432 in 102 households. The following census in 2011 counted 535 people in 143 households. The 2016 census measured the population of the village as 506 people in 151 households.
