= Khuygan-e Sofla =

Village in Isfahan province, Iran

Khuygan-e Sofla Persian: خویگان سفلی
- Village
- Location within Iran
- Coordinates: 32°49′56″N 50°22′31″E
- Country: Iran
- Province: Isfahan
- County: Faridan
- District: Central
- Rural District: Varzaq-e Jonubi

Population (2016)
  - Total: 1,017
- Time zone: UTC+3:30 (IRST)

Khuygan-e Sofla (Persian: خویگان سفلی) (Note: Also romanized as Khūygān-e Soflá; also known as Khoijān, Khūygān, Khūygān-e Pā’īn, and Khvoyjān) is a village in Varzaq-e Jonubi Rural District of the Central District in Faridan County, Isfahan province, Iran.

== Demographics ==
=== Language ===
The vast majority of the town is Luri-speaking with an Azeri Turkic-speaking minority.

=== Population ===
At the time of the 2006 National Census, the village's population was 1,682 in 393 households. The following census in 2011 counted 1,544 people in 450 households. The 2016 census measured the population of the village as 1,017 people in 381 households.

== Notable people ==
Asadallah Kian-Arasi, Shia cleric
