= Damaneh =

City in Isfahan province, Iran

Damaneh Persian: دامنه
- City
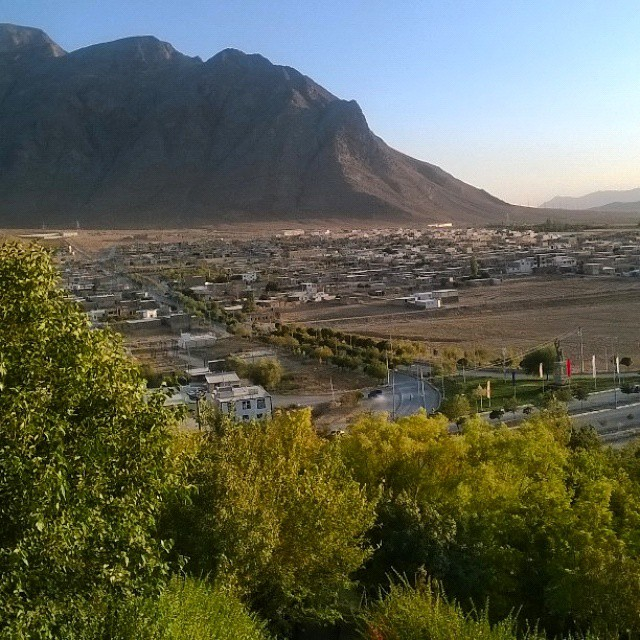
- The city of Damaneh

- Location within Iran
- Coordinates: 33°01′06″N 50°29′19″E
- Country: Iran
- Province: Isfahan
- County: Faridan
- District: Central
- Established as a city: 1996

Population (2016)
  - Total: 4,766
- Time zone: UTC+3:30 (IRST)

Damaneh (Persian: دامنه) (Note: Also romanized as Dāmaneh; also known as Dam Nī, Damneh, and Dunbeni) is a city in the Central District of Faridan County, Isfahan province, Iran, serving as the administrative center for Dalankuh Rural District. The village of Damaneh was converted to a city in 1996.

== Demographics ==
=== Population ===
At the time of the 2006 National Census, the city's population was 4,513 in 1,156 households. The following census in 2011 counted 4,617 people in 1,375 households. The 2016 census measured the population of the city as 4,766 people in 1,382 households.

== Gallery ==
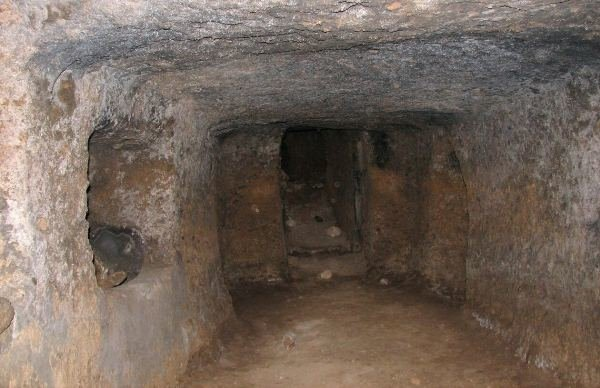
View from the inside of the underground in Damaneh

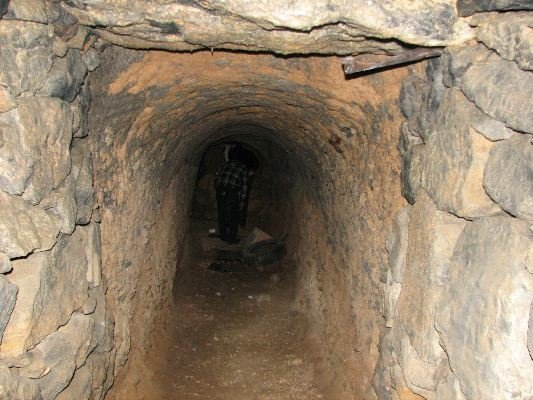
View from the inside of the underground in Damaneh
