= Sorushjan, Iran =

Village in Isfahan province, Iran

Sorushjan Persian: سروشجان
- Village
- Location within Iran
- Coordinates: 32°54′39″N 50°11′48″E
- Country: Iran
- Province: Isfahan
- County: Fereydunshahr
- District: Central
- Rural District: Barf Anbar

Population (2016)
  - Total: 624
- Time zone: UTC+3:30 (IRST)

Soroushjan (Persian: سروشجان) (Note: Also known as Shareshkan, Shirishgūn and Sorūshgān) is a village in Barf Anbar Rural District of the Central District in Fereydunshahr County, Isfahan province, Iran.

== Demographics ==
=== Population ===
At the time of the 2006 National Census, the village's population was 691 in 171 households. The following census in 2011 counted 686 people in 201 households. The 2016 census measured the population of the village as 624 people in 194 households.
