= Varzaq-e Jonubi Rural District =

Rural district in Isfahan province, Iran

Varzaq-e Jonubi Rural District Persian: دهستان ورزق جنوبی
- Rural District
- Location within Iran
- Coordinates: 32°53′N 50°23′E
- Country: Iran
- Province: Isfahan
- County: Faridan
- District: Central
- Established: 1991
- Capital: Seftejan

Population (2016)
  - Total: 6,539
- Time zone: UTC+3:30 (IRST)

Varzaq-e Jonubi Rural District (Persian: دهستان ورزق جنوبی) is in the Central District of Faridan County, Isfahan province, Iran. Its capital is the village of Seftejan.

== Demographics ==
=== Population ===
At the time of the 2006 National Census, the rural district's population was 8,862 in 2,150 households. There were 8,043 inhabitants in 2,331 households at the following census of 2011. The 2016 census measured the population of the rural district as 6,539 in 2,185 households. The most populous of its 13 villages was Nanadegan, with 1,716 people.

=== Other villages in the rural district ===
- Chigan
- Gharghan
- Khuygan-e Sofla
- Mughan
- Nemagerd
- Qaleh-ye Malek
- Savaran
