= Khalilabad, Isfahan =

Village in Isfahan province, Iran

Khalilabad Persian: خليل اباد
- Village
- Location within Iran
- Coordinates: 32°56′01″N 50°13′36″E
- Country: Iran
- Province: Isfahan
- County: Fereydunshahr
- District: Central
- Rural District: Barf Anbar

Population (2016)
  - Total: 307
- Time zone: UTC+3:30 (IRST)

Khalilabad (Persian: خليل اباد) (Note: Also romanized as Khalīlābād; also known as Shāh Bolāgh) is a village in Barf Anbar Rural District of the Central District in Fereydunshahr County, Isfahan province, Iran.

== Demographics ==
=== Population ===
At the time of the 2006 National Census, the village's population was 379 in 84 households. The following census in 2011 counted 361 people in 103 households. The 2016 census measured the population of the village as 307 people in 105 households.
