= Barf Anbar Rural District =

Rural district in Isfahan province, Iran

Barf Anbar Rural District Persian: دهستان برف انبار
- Rural District
- Location within Iran
- Coordinates: 32°55′N 50°13′E
- Country: Iran
- Province: Isfahan
- County: Fereydunshahr
- District: Central
- Established: 1987
- Capital: Barf Anbar

Population (2016)
  - Total: 6,331
- Time zone: UTC+3:30 (IRST)

Barf Anbar Rural District (Persian: دهستان برف انبار) is in the Central District of Fereydunshahr County, Isfahan province, Iran. It is administered from the city of Barf Anbar. (Note: Formerly known as Sang Baran)

== Demographics ==
=== Population ===
At the time of the 2006 National Census, the rural district's population was 7,717 in 1,774 households. There were 7,321 inhabitants in 2,067 households at the following census of 2011. The 2016 census measured the population of the rural district as 6,331 in 1,922 households. The most populous of its 25 villages was Bazmeh, with 1,253 people.

=== Other villages in the rural district ===
- Badjan
- Bijgerd
- Cheqa
- Cheqador
- Dehsur-e Olya
- Dehsur-e Sofla
- Khalilabad
- Khuygan-e Olya
- Mila Gerd
- Sadeqiyeh
- Sorushjan
