= Cheqador =

Village in Isfahan province, Iran

Cheqador Persian: چقادر
- Village
- Location within Iran
- Coordinates: 32°53′41″N 50°13′11″E
- Country: Iran
- Province: Isfahan
- County: Fereydunshahr
- District: Central
- Rural District: Barf Anbar

Population (2016)
  - Total: 187
- Time zone: UTC+3:30 (IRST)

Cheqador (Persian: چقادر) (Note: Also romanized as Chaqadar, Chaqādar, Chaqador, and Cheqādor; also known as Chagha Dor) is a village in Barf Anbar Rural District of the Central District in Fereydunshahr County, Isfahan province, Iran.

== Demographics ==
=== Population ===
At the time of the 2006 National Census, the village's population was 283 in 72 households. The following census in 2011 counted 228 people in 65 households. The 2016 census measured the population of the village as 187 people in 65 households.
