= Bazmeh =

Village in Isfahan province, Iran

Bazmeh Persian: بزمه
- Village
- Location within Iran
- Coordinates: 32°51′18″N 50°16′09″E
- Country: Iran
- Province: Isfahan
- County: Fereydunshahr
- District: Central
- Rural District: Barf Anbar

Population (2016)
  - Total: 1,253
- Time zone: UTC+3:30 (IRST)

Bazmeh (Persian: بزمه) (Note: Also known as Bazheh and Bazma) is a village in Barf Anbar Rural District of the Central District in Fereydunshahr County, Isfahan province, Iran.

== Demographics ==
=== Population ===
At the time of the 2006 National Census, the village's population was 1,430 in 336 households. The following census in 2011 counted 1,519 people in 430 households. The 2016 census measured the population of the village as 1,253 people in 363 households, the most populous in its rural district.
