= Bijgerd =

Village in Isfahan province, Iran

Bijgerd Persian: بيج گرد
- Village
- Location within Iran
- Coordinates: 32°56′44″N 50°11′34″E
- Country: Iran
- Province: Isfahan
- County: Fereydunshahr
- District: Central
- Rural District: Barf Anbar

Population (2016)
  - Total: 422
- Time zone: UTC+3:30 (IRST)

Bijgerd (Persian: بيج گرد) (Note: Also romanized as Bījgerd; also known as Bīzh Gerd) is a village in Barf Anbar Rural District of the Central District in Fereydunshahr County, Isfahan province, Iran.

== Demographics ==
=== Population ===
At the time of the 2006 National Census, the village's population was 421 in 93 households. The following census in 2011 counted 405 people in 119 households. The 2016 census measured the population of the village as 422 people in 130 households.
