= Zayandehrud-e Shomali Rural District =

Rural district in Isfahan province, Iran

Zayandehrud-e Shomali Rural District Persian: دهستان زاینده‌رود شمالی
- Rural District
- Location within Iran
- Coordinates: 32°50′N 50°26′E
- Country: Iran
- Province: Isfahan
- County: Faridan
- District: Central
- Established: 1987
- Capital: Eskandari-ye Baraftab

Population (2016)
  - Total: 3,858
- Time zone: UTC+3:30 (IRST)

Zayandehrud-e Shomali Rural District (Persian: دهستان زاینده‌رود شمالی) is in the Central District of Faridan County, Isfahan province, Iran. Its capital is the village of Eskandari-ye Baraftab.

== Demographics ==
=== Population ===
At the time of the 2006 National Census, the rural district's population was 4,705 in 1,131 households. There were 4,517 inhabitants in 1,360 households at the following census of 2011. The 2016 census measured the population of the rural district as 3,858 in 1,286 households. The most populous of its five villages was Eskandari-ye Baraftab, with 1,601 people.

=== Other villages in the rural district ===
- Adegan
- Bolemir
- Nesar-e Eskandari
- Singerd
