= Dalankuh Rural District =

Rural district in Isfahan province, Iran

Dalankuh Rural District Persian: دهستان دالانکوه
- Rural District
- Location within Iran
- Coordinates: 33°01′N 50°31′E
- Country: Iran
- Province: Isfahan
- County: Faridan
- District: Central
- Established: 1987
- Capital: Damaneh

Population (2016)
  - Total: 3,697
- Time zone: UTC+3:30 (IRST)

Dalankuh Rural District (Persian: دهستان دالانکوه) is in the Central District of Faridan County, Isfahan province, Iran. It is administered from the city of Damaneh.

== Demographics ==
=== Population ===
As of the 2006 National Census, the rural district's population was 3,971 in 995 households. The following 2011 census counted 4,252 inhabitants in 1,199 households. In 2016, the census measured the population of the rural district as 3,697 in 1,204 households. The most populous of its 19 villages was Darreh Bid, with 2,329 residents.

=== Other villages in the rural district ===
- Qafar
- Tarrar
