= Dehsur-e Sofla =

Village in Isfahan province, Iran

Dehsur-e Sofla Persian: ده سورسفلي
- Village
- Location within Iran
- Coordinates: 32°53′01″N 50°14′17″E
- Country: Iran
- Province: Isfahan
- County: Fereydunshahr
- District: Central
- Rural District: Barf Anbar

Population (2016)
  - Total: 329
- Time zone: UTC+3:30 (IRST)

Dehsur-e Sofla (Persian: ده سورسفلي) (Note: Also romanized as Dehsūr-e Soflá; also known as Deh Soor, Deh Sūr, and Dehsūr-e Pā’īn) is a village in Barf Anbar Rural District of the Central District in Fereydunshahr County, Isfahan province, Iran.

== Demographics ==
=== Population ===
At the time of the 2006 National Census, the village's population was 397 in 96 households. The following census in 2011 counted 414 people in 124 households. The 2016 census measured the population of the village as 329 people in 105 households.
