= Qaleh Malek, East Azerbaijan =

Qaleh Malek قلعه ملك
- Village
- Location within Iran
- Coordinates: 38°31′12″N 47°10′16″E
- Country: Iran
- Province: East Azerbaijan
- County: Ahar
- Bakhsh: Central
- Rural District: Owch Hacha

Population (2006)
  - Total: 49
- Time zone: UTC+3:30 (IRST)
  - Summer (DST): UTC+4:30 (IRDT)

Qaleh Malek (Persian: قلعه ملك, also Romanized as Qal‘eh Malek) is a village in Owch Hacha Rural District, in the Central District of Ahar County, East Azerbaijan Province, Iran. At the 2006 census, its population was 49, in 12 families.
