= Mila Gerd =

Village in Isfahan province, Iran

Mila Gerd Persian: ميلاگرد
- Village
- Location within Iran
- Coordinates: 32°54′37″N 50°14′50″E
- Country: Iran
- Province: Isfahan
- County: Fereydunshahr
- District: Central
- Rural District: Barf Anbar

Population (2016)
  - Total: 454
- Time zone: UTC+3:30 (IRST)

Mila Gerd (Persian: ميلاگرد) (Note: Also romanized as Mīlā Gerd; also known as Mīlāgird) is a village in Barf Anbar Rural District of the Central District in Fereydunshahr County, Isfahan province, Iran.

== Demographics ==
=== Population ===
At the time of the 2006 National Census, the village's population was 622 in 133 households. The following census in 2011 counted 523 people in 141 households. The 2016 census measured the population of the village as 454 people in 137 households.
