= Barf Anbar =

City in Isfahan province, Iran

Barf Anbar Persian: برف انبار
- City
- Location within Iran
- Coordinates: 33°00′11″N 50°11′42″E
- Country: Iran
- Province: Isfahan
- County: Fereydunshahr
- District: Central
- Established as a city: 2003

Population (2016)
  - Total: 5,382
- Time zone: UTC+3:30 (IRST)

Barf Anbar (Persian: برف انبار) (Note: Also romanized as Barf Anbār; formerly Sang Baran (سنگ بار)) is a city in the Central District of Fereydunshahr County, Isfahan province, Iran, serving as the administrative center for Barf Anbar Rural District.

== History ==
The village of Sang Baran (سنگ بار), after merging with the village of Khamsalu (خمسلو), was converted to a city and renamed Barf Anbar.

== Demographics ==
=== Population ===
At the time of the 2006 National Census, the city's population was 5,056 in 1,257 households. The following census in 2011 counted 5,336 people in 1,557 households. The 2016 census measured the population of the city as 5,382 people in 1,644 households.

== Neighborhoods ==
=== Khamsalu ===
A handwritten Koran is preserved in one of the mosques of Khamsalu that was composed on the order of Hajj Reza Ali of the Kalbi family several hundred years ago. The document is unique for recounting in its last pages both the events of the famine days in Iran and for recording the prices of goods at the rates of the time.

=== Sang Baran ===
As a village, Sang Baran was the capital of Barf Anbar Rural District before Barf Anbar became a municipality. The residents of the village were Armenians in the past, but they migrated to Isfahan and were replaced by Muslims. There are currently three Armenian cemeteries in the Sang Baran neighborhood, each more than 200 years old.
