= Qarah Bisheh Rural District =

Rural district in Isfahan province, Iran

Qarah Bisheh Rural District Persian: دهستان قره بیشه
- Rural District
- Location within Iran
- Coordinates: 33°05′N 50°18′E
- Country: Iran
- Province: Isfahan
- County: Faridan
- District: Zendehrud
- Established: 2013
- Capital: Chehel Khaneh

Population (2016)
  - Total: 1,581
- Time zone: UTC+3:30 (IRST)

Qarah Bisheh Rural District (Persian: دهستان قره بیشه) is in Zendehrud District of Faridan County, Isfahan province, Iran. Its capital is the village of Chehel Khaneh.

== History ==
In 2013, Varzaq Rural District was separated from the Central District in the formation of Zendehrud District, and Qarah Bisheh Rural District was created in the new district.

== Demographics ==
=== Population ===
At the time of the 2016 National Census, the rural district's population was 1,581 in 485 households. The most populous of its 18 villages was Chehel Khaneh, with 2,533 people.

=== Other villages in the rural district ===
- Badjan
- Ganjeh
- Hasur
- Khalaj
- Ozun Bolagh
- Quhak
