= Janet Badjan-Young =

Gambian playwright and administrator

Janet Badjan-Young (born 1937) is a Gambian playwright and administrator, "easily one of the most prolific playwrights" in the country.

== Biography ==
She has a BA in Drama (UK, 1959) and a Master's degree in Communications (1979, USA). She has spent the greater part of her life outside The Gambia: in Sierra Leone, in Kenya, in Nigeria, and in the Caribbean. She worked for the United Nations Information Centre in Port of Spain, Trinidad and Tobago, before becoming Director of UNIC at Lagos, Nigeria. She is Director of the Ebunjang Theatre complex at Kanifing South.

In 2012, she was one of five Gambian women honoured for their significant contribution to "the development of The Gambia in all aspects of life", receiving the "Award of Excellence".

== Works ==
=== Plays ===
- The Ultimate Inheritance, first staged 2001
- The Battle of Sankandi, first produced 2002.
- The Dance of Katchikali: a dance drama, first staged 2007.
- The Hand of Fate, published 2009.
- Chains of Inspiration, produced 2011.

=== Other ===
- "Collective War Against Poverty", A.M. News, Thursday (April, 1 1): 6.
