= Dehsur-e Olya =

Village in Isfahan province, Iran

Dehsur-e Olya Persian: ده سورعليا
- Village
- Location within Iran
- Coordinates: 32°52′31″N 50°13′57″E
- Country: Iran
- Province: Isfahan
- County: Fereydunshahr
- District: Central
- Rural District: Barf Anbar

Population (2016)
  - Total: 139
- Time zone: UTC+3:30 (IRST)

Dehsur-e Olya (Persian: ده سورعليا) (Note: Also romanized as Dehsūr-e ‘Olyā; also known as Deh Soor, Deh Sūr, and Dehsūr-e Bālā) is a village in Barf Anbar Rural District of the Central District in Fereydunshahr County, Isfahan province, Iran.

== Demographics ==
=== Population ===
At the time of the 2006 National Census, the village's population was 321 in 69 households. The following census in 2011 counted 164 people in 48 households. The 2016 census measured the population of the village as 139 people in 43 households.
