= Daran, Iran =

City in Isfahan province, Iran

Daran Persian: داران
- City
- Location within Iran
- Coordinates: 32°59′11″N 50°24′41″E
- Country: Iran
- Province: Isfahan
- County: Faridan
- District: Central

Population (2016)
  - Total: 20,078
- Time zone: UTC+3:30 (IRST)

Daran (Persian: داران) (Note: Also romanized as Dārān; also known as Dārūn and Farīdān) is a city in the Central District of Faridan County, Isfahan province, Iran, serving as capital of both the county and the district.

== Demographics ==
=== Population ===
At the time of the 2006 National Census, the city's population was 18,930 in 4,763 households. The following census in 2011 counted 19,645 people in 5,354 households. The 2016 census measured the population of the city as 20,078 people in 5,881 households.

== Climate ==
Climate data for Daran (1989-2010 normals, elevation:2,290.0 m (7,513.1 ft)
Month	Jan	Feb	Mar	Apr	May	Jun	Jul	Aug	Sep	Oct	Nov	Dec	Year
Daily mean °C (°F)	−2.8 (27.0)	−0.8 (30.6)	4.3 (39.7)	9.9 (49.8)	14.9 (58.8)	20.2 (68.4)	23.6 (74.5)	22.7 (72.9)	18.6 (65.5)	12.9 (55.2)	6.3 (43.3)	0.8 (33.4)	10.9 (51.6)
Mean daily minimum °C (°F)	−8.1 (17.4)	−5.9 (21.4)	−1.3 (29.7)	3.9 (39.0)	8.2 (46.8)	12.6 (54.7)	16.1 (61.0)	15.0 (59.0)	10.6 (51.1)	5.8 (42.4)	0.4 (32.7)	−4.5 (23.9)	4.4 (39.9)
Average precipitation mm (inches)	44.4 (1.75)	49.2 (1.94)	63.5 (2.50)	50.6 (1.99)	17.2 (0.68)	2.6 (0.10)	1.0 (0.04)	1.1 (0.04)	1.7 (0.07)	8.0 (0.31)	37.4 (1.47)	53.3 (2.10)	330 (12.99)
Average snowy days	8.2	7.1	5.2	1.3	0.1	0	0	0	0	0	1.5	6.5	29.9
Average relative humidity (%)	63	59	52	46	37	26	24	23	24	36	51	61	42
Average dew point °C (°F)	−10.0 (14.0)	−8.6 (16.5)	−6.3 (20.7)	−3.0 (26.6)	−1.2 (29.8)	−1.0 (30.2)	1.4 (34.5)	−0.4 (31.3)	−3.4 (25.9)	−3.3 (26.1)	−4.9 (23.2)	−7.4 (18.7)	−4.0 (24.8)
Mean monthly sunshine hours	205.2	212.3	233.4	237.6	309.8	343.1	343.8	332.6	311.1	270.1	212.0	201.4	3,212.4
Source: Iran Meteorological Organization(temperatures), (humidity), (dew point), (precipitation), (snow/sleet days), (sunshine)
