= Sadeqiyeh =

Village in Isfahan province, Iran

Sadeqiyeh Persian: صادقيه
- Village
- Location within Iran
- Coordinates: 32°57′22″N 50°12′23″E
- Country: Iran
- Province: Isfahan
- County: Fereydunshahr
- District: Central
- Rural District: Barf Anbar

Population (2016)
  - Total: 201
- Time zone: UTC+3:30 (IRST)

Sadeqiyeh (Persian: صادقيه) (Note: Also romanized as Şādeqīyeh) is a village in Barf Anbar Rural District of the Central District in Fereydunshahr County, Isfahan province, Iran.

== Demographics ==
=== Language ===
The town is about 60% Georgian-speaking, 30% Azeri Turkic-speaking and the rest being standard Persian.

=== Population ===
At the time of the 2006 National Census, the village's population was 279 in 63 households. The following census in 2011 counted 248 people in 74 households. The 2016 census measured the population of the village as 201 people in 64 households.
