= Badjan, Fereydunshahr =

Village in Isfahan province, Iran

Badjan Persian: بادجان
- Village
- Location within Iran
- Coordinates: 32°55′50″N 50°10′37″E
- Country: Iran
- Province: Isfahan
- County: Fereydunshahr
- District: Central
- Rural District: Barf Anbar

Population (2016)
  - Total: 267
- Time zone: UTC+3:30 (IRST)

Badjan (Persian: بادجان) (Note: Also romanized as Bādjān; formerly known as Badejan Akhureh (بادجان اخوره), also romanized as Bādejān Ākhūreh; also known as Bādejān Ākhoreh) is a village in Barf Anbar Rural District of the Central District in Fereydunshahr County, Isfahan province, Iran.

== Demographics ==
=== Population ===
At the time of the 2006 National Census, the village's population, as Badejan Akhureh, was 303 in 70 households. The following census in 2011 counted 273 people in 76 households, by which time the village was listed as Badjan. The 2016 census measured the population of the village as 267 people in 79 households.
