= Khuygan-e Olya =

Village in Isfahan province, Iran

Khuygan-e Olya Persian: خويگان عليا
- Village
- Location within Iran
- Coordinates: 33°01′30″N 50°09′37″E
- Country: Iran
- Province: Isfahan
- County: Fereydunshahr
- District: Central
- Rural District: Barf Anbar

Population (2016)
  - Total: 1,177
- Time zone: UTC+3:30 (IRST)

Khuygan-e Olya (Persian: خويگان عليا) (Note: Also romanized as Khūygān-e ‘Olyā; also known as Khāygaz, Khāygon, Khūgān, Khūīgān, Khuijān, Khūygān, and Khūygān-e Arāmeneh)) is a village in Barf Anbar Rural District of the Central District in Fereydunshahr County, Isfahan province, Iran.

== Demographics ==
=== Population ===
At the time of the 2006 National Census, the village's population was 1,391 in 330 households. The following census in 2011 counted 1,410 people in 379 households. The 2016 census measured the population of the village as 1,177 people in 350 households.
