= Varzaq Rural District =

Rural district in Isfahan province, Iran

Varzaq Rural District Persian: دهستان ورزق
- Rural District
- Location within Iran
- Coordinates: 32°57′N 50°18′E
- Country: Iran
- Province: Isfahan
- County: Faridan
- District: Zendehrud
- Established: 1987
- Capital: Derakhtak

Population (2016)
  - Total: 1,632
- Time zone: UTC+3:30 (IRST)

Varzaq Rural District (Persian: دهستان ورزق) is in Zendehrud District of Faridan County, Isfahan province, Iran. Its capital is the village of Derakhtak. The previous capital of the rural district was the village of Nahr-e Khalaj, now in Qarah Bisheh Rural District.

== Demographics ==
=== Population ===
At the time of the 2006 National Census, the rural district's population (as a part of the Central District) was 13,055 in 3,354 households. There were 12,532 inhabitants in 3,636 households at the following census of 2011. The 2016 census measured the population of the rural district as 1,632 in 518 households, by which time the rural district had been separated from the district in the formation of Zendehrud District. The most populous of its 10 villages was Dehaq, with 630 people.

=== Other villages in the rural district ===
- Qudjanak
