= Zendehrud District =

District in Isfahan province, Iran

Zendehrud District Persian: بخش زنده‌رود
- District
- Location within Iran
- Coordinates: 33°01′N 50°18′E
- Country: Iran
- Province: Isfahan
- County: Faridan
- Established: 2013
- Capital: Nahr-e Khalaj

Population (2016)
  - Total: 11,270
- Time zone: UTC+3:30 (IRST)

Zendehrud District (Persian: بخش زنده‌رود) is in Faridan County, Isfahan province, Iran. Its capital is the village of Nahr-e Khalaj.

== History ==
In 2013, Varzaq Rural District was separated from the Central District in the formation of Zendehrud District.

== Demographics ==
=== Population ===
At the time of the 2016 National Census, the district's population was 11,270 inhabitants in 3,593 households.

=== Administrative divisions ===
Zendehrud District Population
Administrative Divisions	2016
Qarah Bisheh RD	9,638
Varzaq RD	1,632
Total	11,270
RD = Rural District
