= Central District (Faridan County) =

District in Isfahan province, Iran

Central District (Faridan County) Persian: بخش مرکزی شهرستان فریدن
- District
- Location within Iran
- Coordinates: 32°57′N 50°29′E
- Country: Iran
- Province: Isfahan
- County: Faridan
- Capital: Daran

Population (2016)
  - Total: 38,538
- Time zone: UTC+3:30 (IRST)

The Central District of Faridan County (Persian: بخش مرکزی شهرستان فریدن) is in Isfahan province, Iran. Its capital is the city of Daran.

== History ==
In 2013, Varzaq Rural District was separated from the district in the establishment of Zendehrud District.

== Demographics ==
=== Population ===
At the time of the 2006 National Census, the district's population was 54,036 in 13,549 households. The following census in 2011 counted 53,606 people in 15,255 households. The 2016 census measured the population of the district as 38,538 inhabitants in 11,938 households.

=== Administrative divisions ===
Central District (Faridan County) Population
Administrative Divisions	2006	2011	2016
Dalankuh RD	3,971	4,252	3,697
Varzaq RD (Note: Transferred to Zendehrud District)	13,055	12,532	
Varzaq-e Jonubi RD	8,862	8,043	6,539
Zayandehrud-e Shomali RD	4,705	4,517	3,858
Damaneh (city)	4,513	4,617	4,366
Daran (city)	18,930	19,645	20,078
Total	54,036	53,606	38,538
RD = Rural District
