= Faridan County =

County in Isfahan province, Iran

Faridan County Persian: شهرستان فریدن
- County
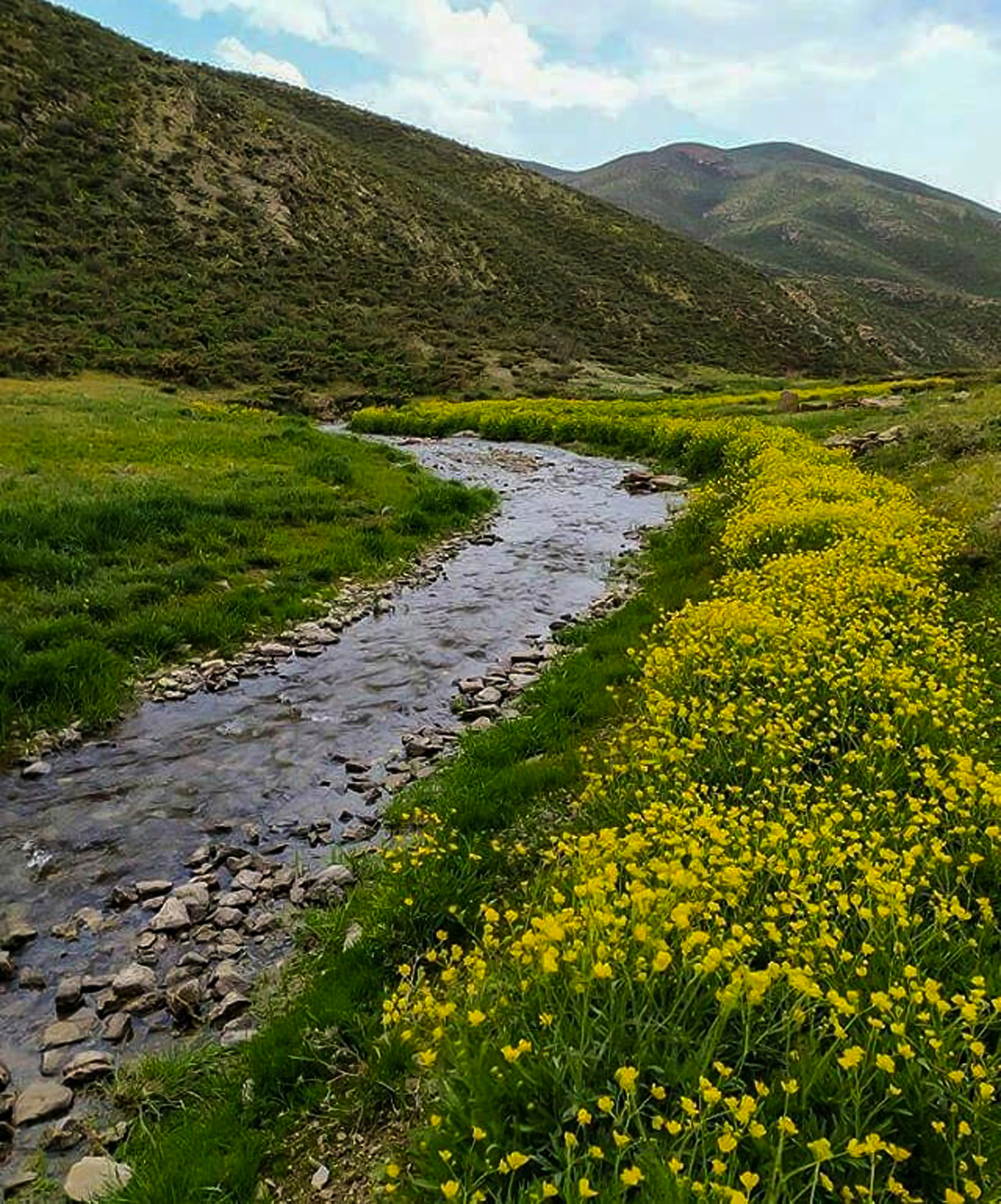
- Landscape near the village of Nanadegan

- Location of Faridan County in Isfahan province (left, purple)

- Location of Isfahan province in Iran
- Coordinates: 32°57′N 50°26′E
- Country: Iran
- Province: Isfahan
- Capital: Daran
- Districts: Central, Zendehrud

Population (2016)
  - Total: 49,890
- Time zone: UTC+3:30 (IRST)

Faridan County (Persian: شهرستان فریدن) is in Isfahan province, Iran. Its capital is the city of Daran.

== History ==
In 2013, Buin Miandasht District was separated from the county in the establishment of Buin Miandasht County. At the same time, Varzaq Rural District was separated from the Central District in the formation of Zendehrud District, including the new Qarah Bisheh Rural District.

== Demographics ==
=== Population ===
At the time of the 2006 National Census, the county's population was 81,622 in 20,215 households. The following census in 2011 counted 79,743 people in 22,770 households. The 2016 census measured the population of the county as 49,890 in 15,547 households.

=== Administrative divisions ===
Faridan County's population history and administrative structure over three consecutive censuses are shown in the following table.

Faridan County Population
Administrative Divisions	2006	2011	2016
Central District	54,036	53,606	38,538
Dalankuh RD	3,971	4,252	3,697
Varzaq RD	13,055	12,532	
Varzaq-e Jonubi RD	8,862	8,043	6,539
Zayandehrud-e Shomali RD	4,705	4,517	3,858
Damaneh (city)	4,513	4,617	4,366
Daran (city)	18,930	19,645	20,078
Buin Miandasht District (Note: Transferred to Buin Miandasht County)	27,586	26,137	
Gorji RD	606	526	
Karchambu-ye Jonubi RD	2,425	2,019	
Karchambu-ye Shomali RD	3,293	2,446	
Sardsir RD	3,512	2,838	
Yeylaq RD	4,012	3,739	
Afus (city)	3,805	4,313	
Buin Miandasht (city)	9,933	10,256	
Zendehrud District			11,270
Qarah Bisheh RD			9,638
Varzaq RD			1,632
Total	81,622	79,743	49,890
RD = Rural District

== See also ==
Media related to Faridan County at Wikimedia Commons
