= List of Assyrian settlements =

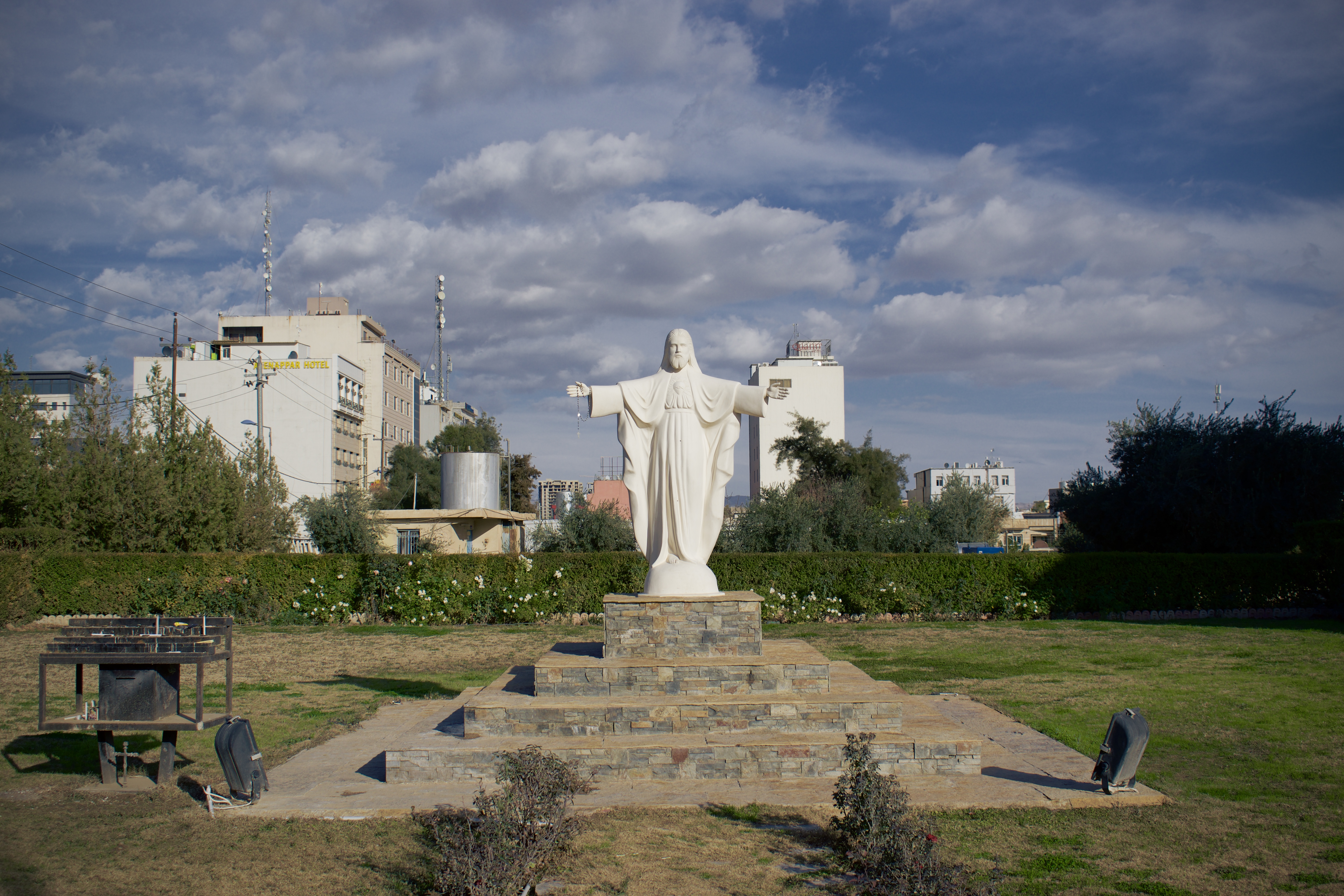
A statue of the Jesus in Ankawa, Kurdistan Region, one of the largest modern Assyrian communities in the Assyrian homeland and is also the patriarchate of the Assyrian Church of the East.

The following is a list of historical and contemporary Assyrian settlements in the Middle East. This list includes settlements of Assyrians from Southeastern Anatolia who left their indigenous tribal districts in Hakkari (or the historical Hakkari region), Sirnak and Mardin province due to religious persecution, violence and displacement by Ottomans, Kemalists and Kurds in the First World War. Many Assyrians from Urmia, Iran were also affected and as such have emigrated and settled in other towns. Resettling again occurred during the Simele massacre in northern Iraq, perpetrated by the Iraqi military coup in the 1930s, with many fleeing to northeastern Syria.

Most modern resettlement is located in Iraq, Syria, Turkey, and Iran in the cities of Baghdad, Habbaniyah, Kirkuk, Duhok, Al-Hasakah, Tehran, Mardin and Damascus. Few Assyrian settlements exist in Turkey today and also in the Caucasus. The exodus to the cities or towns of these aforementioned countries occurred between the late 1910s and the 1930s. After the Iraq War in 2003, a number of Assyrians in Baghdad relocated to the Assyrian homeland in northern Iraq. Many others have immigrated to North America, Europe and Australia, especially in the late 20th century and 21st century. Currently, there are a number of settlements on this list that have been abandoned due to persecution, conflict, and other causes.

== Iraq ==
=== Baghdad Province ===
Settlement	Aramaic	Province	District	Note(s)
Dora	ܕܘܿܪܐ	Baghdad	Al Rashid	1,500 Christians, mostly adherents of the Assyrian Church of the East and Chaldean Catholic Church, inhabit Dora as of December 2014. Before the Iraq War Dora was home to 150,000 Christians.

=== Dohuk Province ===
Duhok Province

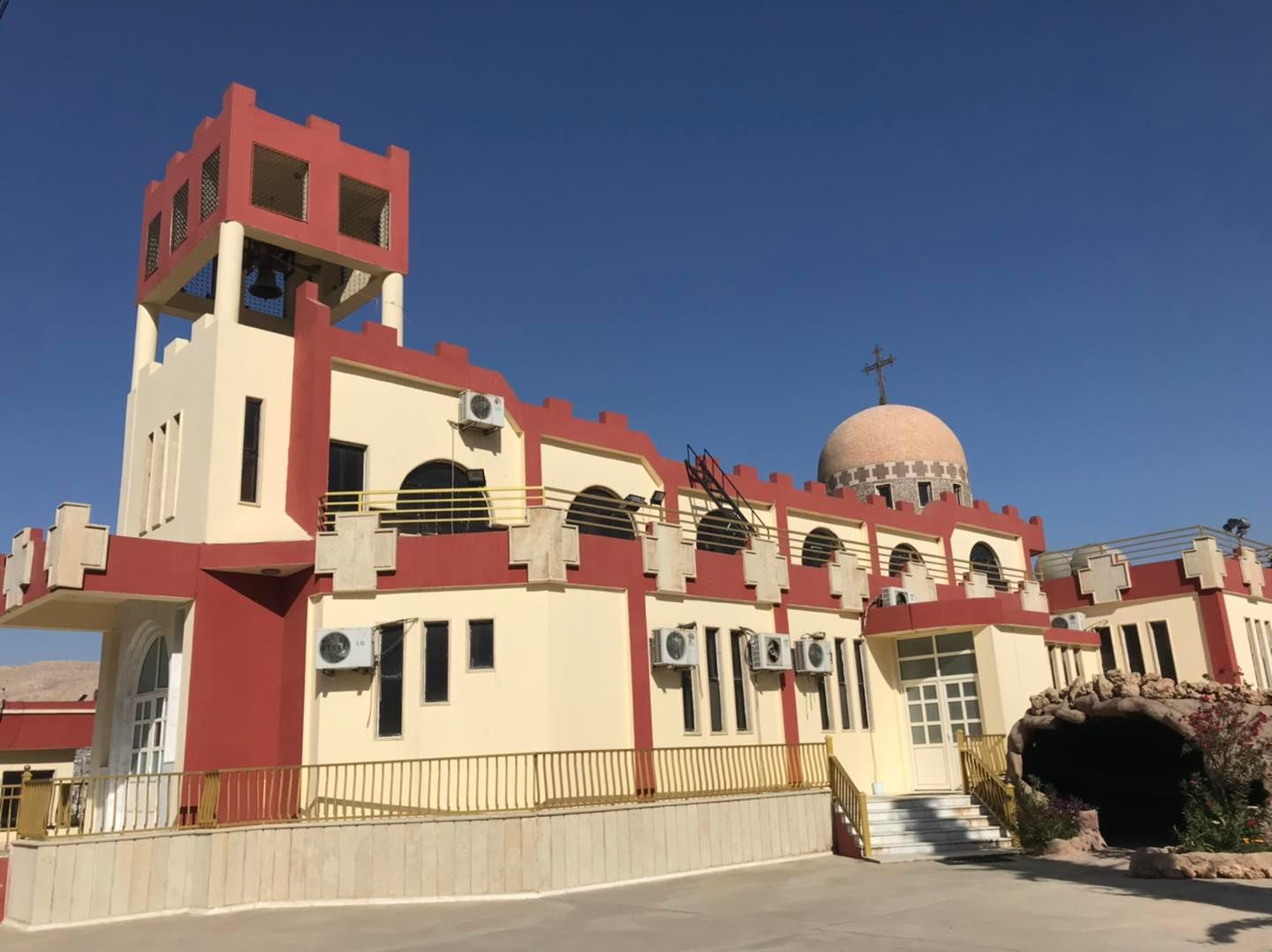
Assyrian Mar Narsai Church in Duhok

Settlement	Aramaic	Province	District	Note(s)
Araden	ܐܪܕܢ	Dohuk	Amadiya	35 Assyrian families inhabit Araden as of May 2004
Enishke	ܐܝܢܫܟܐ	Dohuk(Nuhadrah)	Amadiya	30 Assyrian families inhabit Enishke as of May 2004
Sarsing	ܣܪܣܢܓ	Dohuk	Amadiya	150 Assyrian families inhabit Sarsing as of May 2004
Badarash	ܒܪܕܪܐܫ	Dohuk(Nuhadrah)	Amadiya	40 Assyrian families inhabit Badarash as of May 2004
Amadiya	ܥܡܝܕܝܐ	Dohuk	Amadiya	
Baz	ܒܵܙ	Dohuk(Nuhadrah)	Amadiya	10 Assyrian families inhabited Baz in May 2004. 40 Christian and Muslim families inhabit Baz as of June 2011
Bebadi	ܒܝܬ ܒܥܕܝ	Dohuk	Amadiya	30 Assyrian families inhabit Bebadi as of May 2004
Belejane	ܒܠܝܓ̰ܢܐ	Dohuk(Nuhadrah)	Amadiya	15 Assyrian families inhabit Belejane as of May 2004
Belmand	ܒܠܡܢܕ	Dohuk(Nuhadrah)	Amadiya	50 Assyrian families inhabit Belmand as of May 2004
Beqolke	ܒܹܩܘܠܟܐ	Dohuk(Nuhadrah)	Amadiya	74 Assyrians inhabited Beqolke in 1957; 7 Assyrian families inhabited Beqolke in 1978; 4 Assyrian families inhabit Beqolke as of 1991
Benatha	ܒܹܢܬܐ	Dohuk(Nuhadrah)	Amadiya	8 Assyrian families inhabit Benatha as of May 2004
Beth Shmayaye	ܒܝܬ ܫܡܝܝܐ	Dohuk(Nuhadrah)	Amadiya	
Beth Tanura	ܒܝܬ ܬܢܘܪܐ	Dohuk(Nuhadrah)	Amadiya	
Chalek		Dohuk	Amadiya	10 Assyrian families inhabit Chalek as of May 2004
Chem Rabatke	ܟ̰ܡ ܪܒܬܟܐ	Dohuk(Nuhadrah)	Amadiya	
Dawodiya	ܕܘܘܕܝܐ	Dohuk(Nuhadrah)	Amadiya	
Dehi	ܕܗܐ	Dohuk(Nuhadrah)	Amadiya	20 Assyrian families inhabit Dehi as of 1991
Dere	ܕܝܪܐ	Dohuk(Nuhadrah)	Amadiya	323 Assyrians inhabited Dere in 1957; 250 Assyrians inhabited Dere in 1988; 25 Assyrian families inhabit Dere as of May 2004
Derishke	ܕܝܪܫܟܐ	Dohuk(Nuhadrah)	Amadiya	20 Assyrian families inhabit Derishke as of May 2004
Doreeh	ܕܘܪܗ	Dohuk(Nuhadrah)	Amadiya	30 Assyrian families inhabit Dore as of May 2004
Eqri	ܐܩܪܝ	Dohuk(Nuhadrah)	Amadiya	
Eyat	ܐܝܬ	Dohuk(Nuhadrah)	Amadiya	169 Assyrians inhabited Eyat in 1957; 19 Assyrian families inhabit Eyat as of 2013
Hayes	ܗܝܤ	Dohuk(Nuhadrah)	Amadiya	
Hezany	ܗܝܙܢܐ	Dohuk(Nuhadrah)	Amadiya	27 Assyrian families inhabit Hezany as of 1991
Jadide	ܓ̰ܕܝܕܐ	Dohuk(Nuhadrah)	Amadiya	
Jelek		Dohuk	Amadiya	519 Assyrians inhabited Jelek in 1957; 62 Assyrian families inhabit Jelek as of 2011
Jole	ܫ̰ܘܠܐ	Dohuk(Nuhadrah)	Amadiya	
Kani Balavi	ܟܢܝ ܒܠܦ̮ܐ	Dohuk(Nuhadrah)	Amadiya	15 Assyrian families inhabit Kani Balavi as of May 2004
Khalilane	ܚܠܝܠܢܐ	Dohuk(Nuhadrah)	Amadiya	20 Assyrian families inhabit Khalilane as of May 2004
Komany	ܟܘܡܢܐ	Dohuk(Nuhadrah)	Amadiya	20 Assyrian families inhabit Komany as of May 2004
Mangesh	ܡܢܓܫܐ	Dohuk(Nuhadrah)	Amadiya	1195 Assyrians inhabited Mangesh in 1947; 959 Assyrians inhabited Mangesh in 1965
Margajiya	ܡܪܓܐ ܓ̰ܝܐ	Dohuk(Nuhadrah)	Amadiya	
Maye	ܡܝܐ	Dohuk(Nuhadrah)	Amadiya	10 Assyrian families inhabit Maye as of May 2004
Meristek	ܡܝܪܣܬܟ	Dohuk(Nuhadrah)	Amadiya	
Meroge	ܡܝܪܘܓܐ	Dohuk(Nuhadrah)	Amadiya	
Meze	ܡܝܙܐ	Dohuk	Amadiya	
Mosaka	ܡܘܣܵܟܵܐ	Dohuk	Amadiya	
Sardarawa	ܣܪ ܕܪܒܐ	Dohuk(Nuhadrah)	Amadiya	
Sardashte	ܣܪܐ ܕܫܬܐ	Dohuk(Nuhadrah)	Amadiya	
Sikrine	ܣܟܪܝܢܐ	Dohuk	Amadiya	
Tashish	ܬܫܝܫ	Dohuk(Nuhadrah)	Amadiya	163 Assyrians inhabited Tashish in 1957.
Aqrah	ܥܩܪܐ	Dohuk	Aqrah	
Nohawa	ܢܘܗܒܐ	Dohuk(Nuhadrah)	Aqrah	
Babelo	ܒܵܒܠܘ	Dohuk(Nuhadrah)	Dohuk	
Bagerat	ܒܓܝܪܬ	Dohuk(Nuhadrah)	Dohuk	
Dohuk	ܢܘܗܕܪܐ	Dohuk	Dohuk	
Gondekosa	ܓܘܢܕ ܟܘܣܐ	Dohuk	Dohuk	
Korygavana	ܟܘܪܝܓܦ̮ܢܐ	Dohuk(Nuhadrah)	Dohuk	
Zawita	ܙܘܝܬܐ	Dohuk	Dohuk	
Avzrog	ܐܒܙܪܘܓ	Dohuk	Semel	
Bajed Berav	ܒܓ̰ܕ ܒܝܪܦ̮	Dohuk(Nuhadrah)	Semel	
Bajed Kindal	ܒܓ̰ܕ ܟܝܢܕܠ	Dohuk(Nuhadrah)	Semel	
Bakhetme	ܒܚܬܡܐ	Dohuk	Semel	
Bakhloja	ܒܚܠܘܓ̰ܐ	Dohuk(Nuhadrah)	Semel	
Jambor	ܓ̰ܡܒܘܪ	Dohuk(Nuhadrah)	Semel	
Mar Yakoo	ܡܪܝ ܝܥܩܘܒ	Dohuk(Nuhadrah)	Semel	79 Assyrian families inhabit Mar Yakoo as of 2011
Simele	ܣܡܠܐ	Dohuk	Semel	
Sheze	ܫܝܙ	Dohuk(Nuhadrah)	Semel	Inhabited as of November 2011
Shkafte	ܫܟܦ̮ܬܐ	Dohuk(Nuhadrah)	Semel	
Surka	ܨܘܪܟܐ	Dohuk(Nuhadrah)	Semel	
Berseve	ܒܝܪܣܦ̮ܐ	Dohuk(Nuhadrah)	Zakho	
Dashtatakh	ܕܫܬܟ	Dohuk(Nuhadrah)	Zakho	
Dera Shish	ܕܝܪܐ ܫܝܫ	Dohuk(Nuhadrah)	Zakho	250 Assyrians inhabited Dera Shish in 1976; 8 Assyrian families inhabit Dera Shish as of 2011
Levo	ܠܝܦ̮ܘ	Dohuk(Nuhadrah)	Zakho	
Marga	ܡܪܓܐ	Dohuk(Nuhadrah)	Zakho	
Margasor	ܡܝܪܓܐ ܣܘܪ	Dohuk(Nuhadrah)	Zakho	
Navkandala	ܢܐܦ̮ ܟܢܕܠܐ	Dohuk(Nuhadrah)	Zakho	
Piraka	ܦܝܪܟܐ	Dohuk(Nuhadrah)	Zakho	
Qarawula	ܩܪܘܠܐ	Dohuk(Nuhadrah)	Zakho	334 Assyrians inhabited Qarawula in 1957; inhabited by 66 Assyrian families in 1975. Inhabited as of November 2011.
Sharanesh	ܫܪܢܘܫ	Dohuk(Nuhadrah)	Zakho	
Zakho	ܙܟܼܘ	Dohuk(Nuhadrah)	Zakho	A Chaldo-Assyrian tribe, associated with Catholic Assyrians. It has been inhabited by Assyrians since the 5th century. Assyrians from Hakkari, Turkey, have resettled there to escape persecution and violence by Ottoman Turks in the early 20th century. Nuhadrah is the ancient Assyrian name for what is now called Duhok to 'foreigners. Erbil is another name that is called something within the indigenous people of that land, the Assyrians.

=== Erbil Province ===
Erbil Province

Settlement	Aramaic	Province	District	Note(s)
Ankawa	ܥܢܟܒܐ	Erbil	Erbil	
Armota	ܐܪܡܥܘܛܐ	Erbil	Koya	
Batas	ܒܬܣ	Erbil	Shaqlawa	
Bidial	ܒܕܝܠ	Erbil	Barzan	5 Assyrian families inhabit Bidial as of 1991
Darbandokeh	ܕܪܒܢܕܘܟܐ	Erbil	Shaqlawa	
Diana	ܕܝܢܐ	Erbil	Soran	
Harir	ܗܪܝܪ	Erbil	Shaqlawa	
Hawdiyan		Erbil	Shaqlawa	
Hinari		Erbil		
Koy Sanjaq	ܟܘܝܐ	Erbil	Koy Sinjaq	
Rowanduz	ܪܘܢܕܝܙ	Erbil	Soran	
Seerishmi	ܣܝܪܫܡܝ	Erbil		
Shaqlawa	ܫܩܠܒܐ	Erbil	Shaqlawa	
Qalata	ܩܠܬܐ	Erbil		

=== Kirkuk Governorate ===
Settlement	Aramaic	Province	District	Note(s)
Kirkuk	ܟܪܟ	Kirkuk	Around 1,605 Assyrians lived there up until 1957	

=== Nineveh Province ===
Ninawa Province

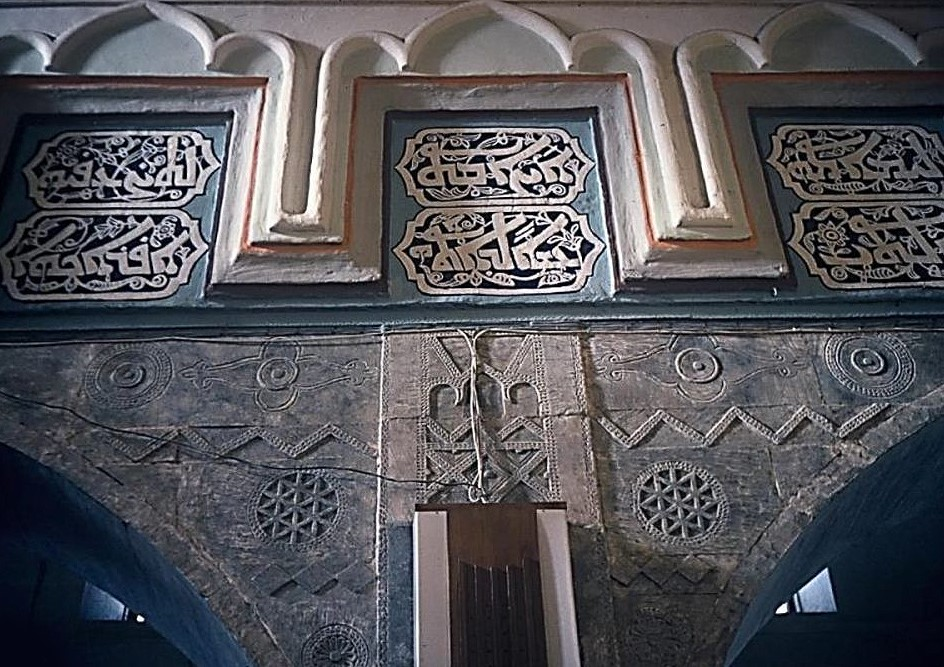
Interior view of the Meskinta Assyrian-Chaldean Church in Mosul

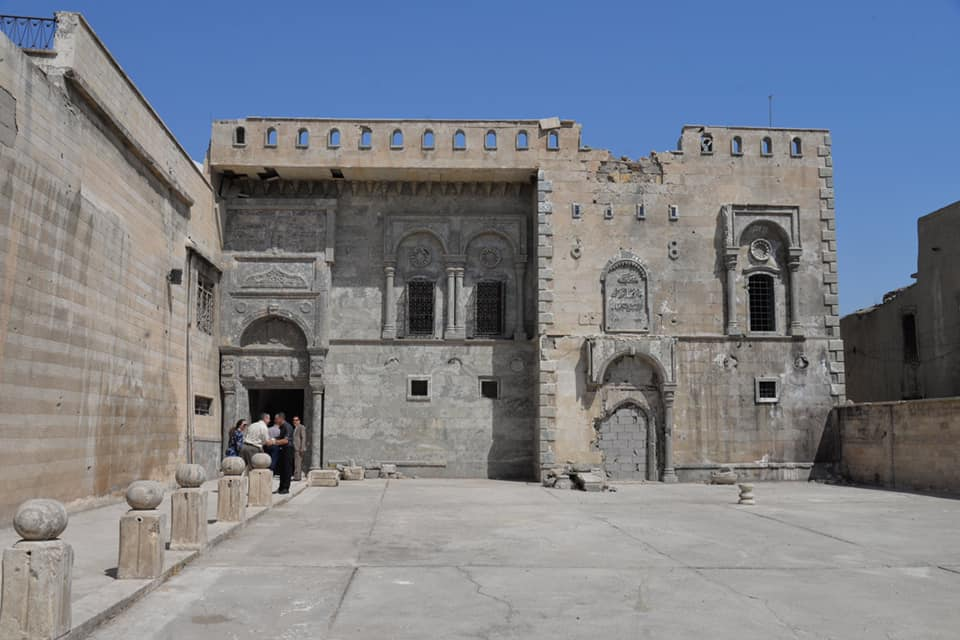
Church of Saint Thomas, Mosul

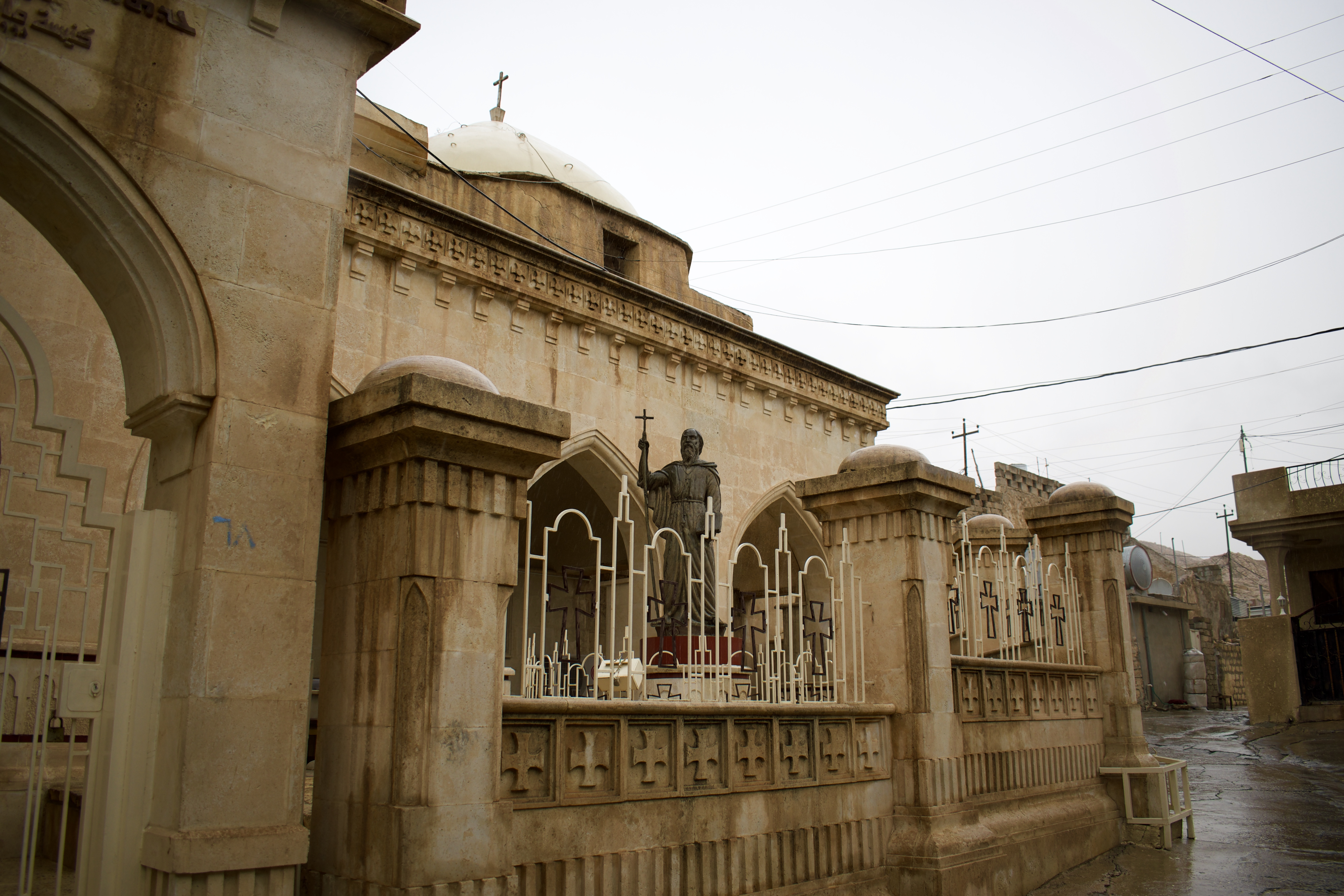
Saint Michael's church in Alqosh

Settlement	Aramaic	Province	District	Note(s)
Mosul	ܡܘܨܠ	Nineveh	Al-Mosul	Assyrians have inhabited the city of Mosul for over a millennia. Population records show a continuous Assyrian presence in Mosul from at least the 16th century. The monastery of Mar Matti is an hour from the northern region of Erbil.Many families across the globe visit to celebrate events such as Lent (Eid) and the day of Mar Matti Assyrians from Mosul (known as Mawasli) are Arabic-speaking, their dialect belongs to North Mesopotamian Arabic. Most belong to Syriac churches; the Syriac Orthodox Church, the Syriac Catholic Church, and the Chaldean Catholic Church. A few having converted from Syriac churches to Protestantism starting in the mid 19th century. The majority of Mosul Assyrians migrated south to Baghdad in the 1960s due to political unrest and persecution, (1959 Mosul Uprising). However, Assyrians continued to live in Mosul until being fully driven out by ISIS in 2014. After the recapturing of Mosul, only a few Assyrian families have returned to the city.
Ain Sifni	ܥܝܢ ܣܦܢܐ	Nineveh	Shekhan	
Alqosh	ܐܠܩܘܫ	Nineveh	Tel Keppe	Ancient Assyrian tribe associated with Catholic Assyrians. It was also settled by Assyrians from Hakkari after 1914.
Bandwaya		Nineveh	Tel-Keppe	
Bakhdida	ܒܟܕܝܕܐ	Nineveh	Al-Hamdaniya	Was an ancient, pre-Christian Assyrian town filled with historical artifacts. Always had a significant Christian minority in modern times. Was also settled by Assyrians from southeastern Turkey.
Balawat	ܒܝܬ ܠܒܬ	Nineveh	Al-Hamdaniya	
Baqofah	ܒܬܢܝܐ	Nineveh	Tel Keppe	
Bartella	ܒܪܬܠܐ	Nineveh	Al-Hamdaniya	Home to Oriental Orthodox Syriacs and Eastern Catholic Syriacs. Most emigrated out of the town due to Islamic terrorism and violence.
Batnaya	ܒܬܢܝܐ	Nineveh	Tel Keppe	Ancient Assyrian tribe associated with Catholic Assyrians. Partially resettled as of now, post-ISIS.
Dashqotan	ܕܫܩܘܬܢ	Nineveh	Shekhan	
Karamles	ܟܪܡܠܝܣ	Nineveh	Al-Hamdaniya	
Jambour		Nineveh	Tel Keppe	
Khorsabad		Nineveh		
Merki	ܡܪܓܐ	Nineveh	Shekhan	
Sharafiya	ܫܪܦܝܐ	Nineveh	Tel Keppe	Tyari Assyrian immigrated here from Hakkari province after persecution and violence by Ottomans in 1914
Tel Keppe	ܬܠ ܟܐܦܐ	Nineveh	Tel Keppe	Ancient Assyrian tribe populated by Catholic Assyrians (Chaldeans). Also has had Assyrian settlements from Hakkari.
Tesqopa	ܬܠ ܝܣܩܘܦܐ	Nineveh	Tel Keppe	As above.
Armash	ܥܪܡܫ	Nineveh	Shekhan	
Azakh	ܐܕܟ	Nineveh	Shekhan	
Beboze	ܒܒܘܙܐ	Nineveh	Shekhan	
Dize		Nineveh	Shekhan	
Mala Barwan	ܡܠܐ ܒܪܘܢ	Nineveh	Shekhan	
Tilan	ܬܠܐ	Nineveh	Shekhan	

=== Abandoned villages ===
Settlement	Aramaic	Province	District	Note(s)
Ashawa	ܐܫܘܐ	Dohuk	Amadiya	619 Assyrians inhabited Ashawa in 1957; uninhabited by Assyrians as of May 2004
Bebalok	ܒܝܒܠܘܟ	Dohuk	Amadiya	25 Assyrian families inhabited Bebalok in 1957; uninhabited by Assyrians as of May 2004
Botara	ܒܘܬܪܐ	Dohuk	Amadiya	12 families inhabited Botara in 1957; uninhabited by Assyrians as of May 2004
Dergny	ܕܪܓܢܝ	Dohuk	Amadiya	Uninhabited
Halwa	ܗܠܘܐ	Dohuk	Amadiya	40 Assyrian families inhabited Halwa in 1957; uninhabited by Assyrians as of May 2004
Hamziya	ܗܡܙܝܐ	Dohuk	Amadiya	102 Assyrians inhabited Hamziya in 1957; uninhabited by Assyrians as of May 2004
Khwara	ܚܘܪܐ	Dohuk	Amadiya	92 Assyrians inhabited Khwara in 1957; uninhabited by Assyrians as of May 2004
Magrebiya	ܡܓܪܒܝܐ	Dohuk	Amadiya	18 Assyrians inhabited Magrebiya in 1957; uninhabited by Assyrians as of May 2004
Malakhta	ܡܐܠܟܬܐ	Dohuk	Amadiya	28 Assyrians inhabited Malakhta in 1957; uninhabited by Assyrians as of May 2004
Argen	ܐܪܓܢ	Dohuk	Amadiya	Uninhabited
Atosh	ܐܬܘܫ	Dohuk	Amadiya	Uninhabited
Barzanke	ܒܪܙܢܟܐ	Dohuk	Amadiya	Uninhabited
Bash	ܒܫ	Dohuk	Amadiya	Uninhabited
Bobawa	ܒܘܒܘܐ	Dohuk	Amadiya	Uninhabited
Cham Eshrat	ܟ̰ܡ ܐܝܫܪܬ	Dohuk	Amadiya	Uninhabited
Cham Siny	ܟ̰ܡ ܣܝܢܝ	Dohuk	Amadiya	Uninhabited
Chamike	ܟ̰ܡܝܟܐ	Dohuk	Amadiya	Uninhabited
Chaqala	ܟ̰ܩܠܐ	Dohuk	Amadiya	Uninhabited
Chem Chale	ܟ̰ܡ ܟ̰ܠܐ	Dohuk	Amadiya	Uninhabited
Dohoke	ܕܘܗܘܟܐ	Dohuk	Amadiya	Uninhabited
Essan	ܐܝܣܢ	Dohuk	Amadiya	Uninhabited
Estep	ܐܣܬܦ	Dohuk	Amadiya	Uninhabited
Hawarke	ܗܒܪܝܟܐ	Dohuk	Amadiya	Uninhabited
Hawentka	ܗܒܢܬܟܐ	Dohuk	Amadiya	Uninhabited
Hish	ܬܝܫ	Dohuk	Amadiya	Uninhabited
Mahode	ܡܗܘܕܐ	Dohuk	Amadiya	Uninhabited
Maydan	ܡܝܕܐܢ	Dohuk	Amadiya	Uninhabited
Nerwa	ܢܪܒܐ ܬܚܬܝܬܐ	Dohuk	Amadiya	Uninhabited, see also Nerwa Rekan
Qaro	ܩܪܘ	Dohuk	Amadiya	Uninhabited
Sedar	ܣܝܕܪ	Dohuk	Amadiya	Uninhabited
Tashike	ܬܫܝܟܐ	Dohuk	Amadiya	Uninhabited
Wela	ܘܝܠܐ	Dohuk	Amadiya	Uninhabited
Sharman	ܫܪܡܢ	Dohuk	Aqrah	Uninhabited
Shosh	ܫܘܫ	Dohuk	Aqrah	Uninhabited
Badaliya	ܒܕܠܝܐ	Dohuk	Semel	Uninhabited
Der Jondi	ܕܝܪ ܓ̰ܢܕܝ	Dohuk	Semel	Uninhabited
Hejirke	ܗܫ̰ܝܪܟܐ	Dohuk	Semel	Uninhabited
Mawana	ܡܘܢܐ	Dohuk	Semel	Uninhabited
Alanesh	ܐܠܢܝܫ	Dohuk	Zakho	Uninhabited
Bahnona	ܒܗܢܘܢܐ	Dohuk	Zakho	Uninhabited
Benekhre	ܒܝܢܐ ܚܐܪܐ	Dohuk	Zakho	Uninhabited
Bhere	ܒܚܝܪܐ	Dohuk	Zakho	Uninhabited
Der Hozan	ܕܝܪ ܗܘܙܢ	Dohuk	Zakho	Uninhabited
Istablan	ܐܣܬܒܠܢ	Dohuk	Zakho	Uninhabited
Malla Arap	ܡܠܐ ܥܪܒ	Dohuk	Zakho	Uninhabited
Margashish	ܡܪܓܐ ܫܝܫ	Dohuk	Zakho	Uninhabited
Sanat	ܣܢܬ	Dohuk	Zakho	Uninhabited
Shwadan	ܫܘܕܢ	Dohuk	Zakho	Uninhabited
Steblan	ܣܬܒܠܢ	Dohuk	Zakho	Uninhabited
Umra	ܥܘܡܪܐ	Dohuk	Zakho	Uninhabited

== Iran ==
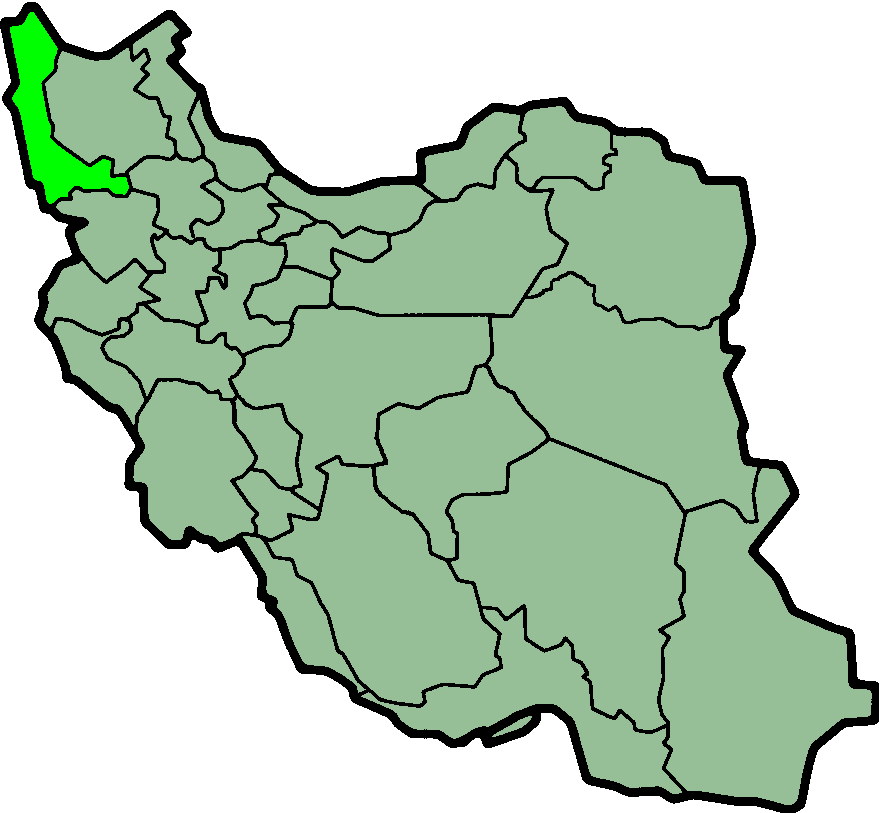
West Azerbaijan, Iran

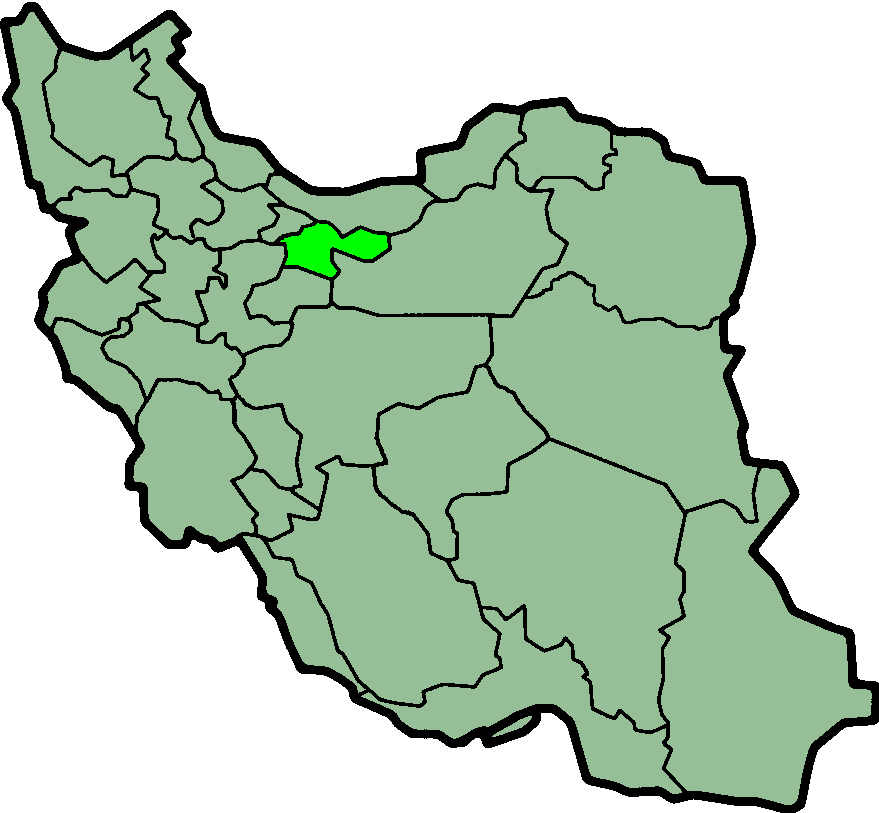
Tehran, Iran

=== West Azerbaijan Province ===
- Akhtekhaneh
- Anhar
- Armod Agaj
- Ada ܥܕܐ
- Ardishai
- Balanej (Balanush)
- Balowlan
- Chamaki
- Charbash (fa)
- Digala (fa)
- Dizataka
- Gavilan
- Geogtapa populated
- Golpashan populated
- Iryawa
- Khanishan
- Khosrava
- Lolham (Lulpa)
- Mar Nukha
- Mar Sargis
- Margawar
- Mawana ܡܥܘܢܐ
- Mushawa (fa)
- Qarajalu
- Saatlou
- Salmas
- Sangar
- Jamlava (Jamalabad)
- Sarna
- Shirabad ܫܝܪܐܒܕ
- Seir
- Sawraa
- Yengija
- Zoomalan ܙܘܡܠܢ

Urmia County

- Margawar
  - Razhani
  - Nergi
  - Gerdik
  - Diza
  - Gullistan
- Salamas
  - Chara
  - Zewajik
  - Ulah
  - Guliser
  - Khanaga
  - Patamur
  - Sawra
  - Delemon
  - Mahlam
  - Sarna
- Tergawar
  - Anbi
  - Balulan
  - Darband
  - Dastalan
  - Haki
  - Qurana
  - Mar Behisho (Iran–Turkey border)
  - Mavana ܡܥܘܢܐ
  - Salona
  - Shibani
  - Tuleki
  - Tulu
- Sumay-ye Beradust District
  - Urmia
  - Mawana ܡܥܘܢܐ
  - Mushabad (fa)
  - Charbash (fa)
  - Borashan
  - Anhar
  - Gulpashan
  - Gug Tappeh
  - Darbarut
  - Mar Sargis
  - Seiri
  - Shirabad ܫܝܪܐܒܕ
  - Kirakiz
  - Chamaki
  - Kuchiye
  - Nazi
  - Kosi
  - Gangachin
  - Sopurghan

=== Iranian Kurdistan ===
- Sanandaj

=== Tehran Province ===
- Gisha

== Syria ==
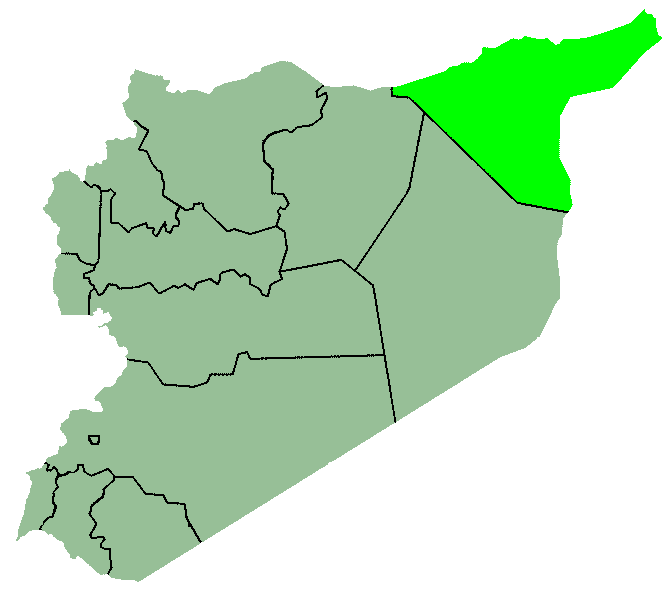
Al Hasakah, Syria

Assyrians immigrated to Syria during the 1930s and 1940s, from northern Iraq, after they were slaughtered and displaced during the Simele massacre perpetrated by the armed forces of the Kingdom of Iraq. Many Assyrians in Syria did not have Syrian citizenship and title to their land until late 1940s. The Assyrians who settled in the Khabour River Valley organized their villages according to their own tribal structure, with each village belonging to a single tribe. As such, each village effectively has two names, the official Arabic name and the unofficial Assyrian name, with the latter being the name of the tribe that built the town.

=== Al-Hasakah Governorate ===
Villages in the Khabour River Valley

- Abu Tinah (Jilu)
- al-Kharitah (Tkhuma)
- Qaber Shamiyah (Diz)
- Tell Ahmar (Upper Tyari)
- Tell Arboush (Tkhuma)
- Tell Balouaah (Diz)
- Tell Baz (Baz)
- Tell Bureij (Tkhuma)
- Tell Damshij (Qodchanis)
- Tell Fuweidat (Nochiya)
- Tell Goran (Jilu)
- Tell Hefyan (Qodchanis)
- Tell Hermez (Tkhuma)
- Tell Jedaya (Gawar)
- Tell Jazira (Eiel)
- Tell Jemaah (Halmoun)
- Tell Kifji (Liwan)
- Tell Makhadah (Tkhuma)
- Tell Maghas (Gawar)
- Tell Massas (Barwar)
- Tell Najma (Sara)
- Tell Nasri (Upper Tyari)
- Tell Ruman Foqani (Baz)
- Tell Ruman Tahtani (Tkhuma)
- Tell Sakra (Tkhuma)
- Tell Shamah (Tkhuma)
- Tell Shamiram (Marbisho)
- Tell Tal (Tkhuma)
- Tell Talaah (Sara)
- Tell Tamer (Upper Tyari)
- Tell Tawil (Upper Tyari)
- Tell Wardiat (Tkhuma)
- Umm al-Keif (Timar)
- Umm Ghargan (Tkhuma)
- Umm Waghfa (Upper Tyari)

Cities and towns with Assyrian population

- Al-Darbasiyah
- Al-Hasakah
- Al-Malikiyah
- Al-Qahtaniyah
- Amuda
- Qamishli
- Ras al-Ayn

Villages

- Berabeytê/Berebeyt (ܒܰܪ ܒܝܬܐܰ ,بره بيت)
- Ghardugah
- Khanik
- Kirku Shamu
- Mahriqan
- Qir Sharan
- Safiyah
- Tal Aluw
- Tall Jana
- Tell Halaf
- Tirbekay

== Turkey ==
Some Assyrians from southeastern Turkey settled to a few nearby towns and cities in eastern Turkey after the genocide in 1914

=== Diyarbakır Province ===
- Diyarbakır

=== Batman Province ===
- Hesno d'Kefo
- Kafro 'Elayto

=== Mardin province ===
- ʼArbo
- ʼAnḥel
- Beth Kustan
- Beth Debe, Turkish: Dibek
- Beth Man’am, Turkish: Bahminir
- Birguriya, Turkish: Birigirya
- Bnebil, Turkish: Benabil
- Boté, Turkish: Bardakçı
- Bsorino
- Chtrako
- Dara, Turkish: Oğuz
- Derelya
- Dayro Daslibo
- Deyrqube
- Ehwo, Turkish: Güzelsu
- Eskikale
- Habsus, Turkish: Mercimekli
- Hah, Turkish: Anıtlı
- Harabale/Arkah, Turkish: Üçköy
- Harabémechka, Turkish: Dağiçi
- Kafro Tahtayto
- Iwardo
- Keferb
- Keferze
- Kelith, Turkish: Dereiçi
- Kerburan
- Kfarbé, Turkish: Güngören
- M’aré, Turkish: Eskihisar
- Ma'asarte, Turkish: Ömerli
- Mardin
- Midyat
- Mor Bobo, Turkish: Günyurdu
- Mzizah
- Nusaybin
- Qritho di‘Ito (Gundeké Sukru)
- Qritho Hanna (Gundeké Hanna)
- Saleh
- Séderi, Turkish: Üçyol
- Zaz

=== Şırnak Province ===
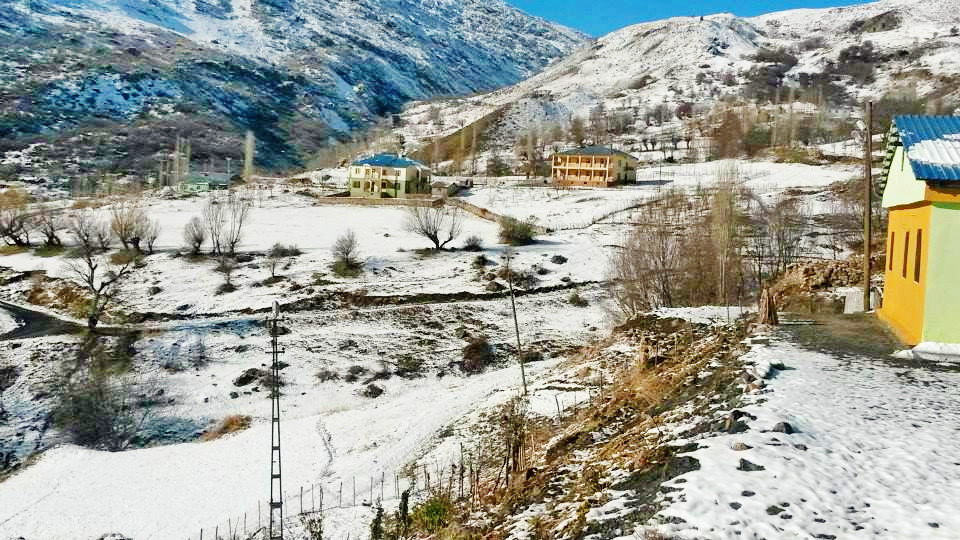
Gaznakh is the only village in Turkey to still have a persevering Assyrian presence since ancient times.

- Azakh, Turkish: İdil
- Hoz, in Beytüşşebap
- Meer, Turkish: Kovankaya
- Öğündük
- Sare/Ester/Gawayto, Turkish: Sarıköy
- Bejo was a purely Assyrian settlement prior to 1925. In 1914 it was home to about 500 people and 100 families, with two ancient churches. Around the mid-19th century the Assyrians of Bejo converted from the Church of the East to Catholicism and came under the authority of the Chaldean Patriarchate of Babylon. Because of Bejo's location right on the Iraqi-Turkish border, the villagers were expelled by the Turkish military in 1925. After their final expulsion from Turkey, the Assyrians of Bejo ("Bejwaye") were resettled in a new village which they named Bejo (or Bajwa), near Zakho in north Iraq. This village had a population of 79 as per the 1957 Iraqi census. Its inhabitants were again moved out in 1976 by the Iraqi authorities and have not yet been able to return to their homes.
- Bohtan. Located in around Cizre in Bohtan Plains in Sirnak province, the mountainous district of Barwar d-Bohtan (Pervari), straddles the Bohtan River (Botan Çayı), which is a tributary of the Tigris River. Prior to 1915, this area contained more than 20 Assyrian settlements, with about 30 churches and monasteries. Up to 6,000 Assyrians resided there, belonging mostly to the Chaldean Catholic Church and the Church of the East. The spiritual centre of the district was the village of Atel, which was the seat of an important bishopric. In the early 20th century, many Assyrian families escaped to Dawodiya in northern Iraq after the persecution of Ottoman authorities.
- Gaznakh has always been a purely Assyrian settlement. Its modern Turkish name means "walnut tree", due to the predominance of walnut trees in the village. In the second half of the 19th century it was home to nearly 100 households. The many sacred sites around the village included the monastery of St. John, and churches dedicated to St. Isaiah, St. Gawsa, St. Shmuni and St. Gabriel. Originally, those in the village were adherents to the Church of the East. After the 1920s, though, with the rest of their community having been banished from Turkey, they turned to either the Chaldean Catholic and Syriac Orthodox Churches in order to be supplemented with the fundamental spiritual and sacramental necessities. The Assyrians of Gaznakh were not forced out of their village in either 1915 or 1924/5, and remained there until the conflict between the Turkish military and rebels from the Kurdistan Workers' Party (PKK) got worse in 1988. The district of Beytüşşebap, in which Gaznakh is located, remained part of Hakkari province until 1990, when it added to the newly-created province of Şırnak. At that time there were at least 300 Assyrians living in Gaznakh, but by 1995 all of them had left. By 2000 it was estimated that there were as many as 1,600 Gaznakh people dispersed in countries such as Turkey, Iraq, France, and Belgium. In 2004, Assyrians began to return to Gaznakh, spearheading a movement in which another three Assyrian villages have also been resettled by their former inhabitants, in the same province. Currently, there are about 50 Assyrians who live in Gaznakh all year round, with many more returning to spend their holidays there in the summer months. The village has electricity, telephone lines, and running water, and is accessible by way of an unsealed dirt road.
- Kespiyanish is now a Kurdish settlement and it is not mentioned in any Syriac sources, manuscripts, or travelers' accounts from the 19th and 20th centuries. Its name though is similar to that of other known Assyrian villages, such as Minyanish, Sharanish, Alanish, Maranish, Azyanish, etc. Furthermore, author and scholar Gordon Taylor reported that, when he visited Kespiyanish in 1977, he was shown the intact structure of the village's old Assyrian church. It is not known if this structure still stands today.
- Marga was a purely Assyrian settlement prior to 1925. Its name in Syriac means a pasture or meadow. In 1914 it was home to about 800 people (150 families), with an ancient church dedicated to St. Abraham. Around the mid-19th century the Assyrians of Marga converted from the Church of the East to Catholicism and came under the authority of the Chaldean Patriarchate of Babylon. Because of Marga's location right on the Iraqi-Turkish border, the villagers were displaced by the Turkish military in 1925. After their final banishment from Turkey, the Assyrians of Marga were resettled in the villages of Levo, Navkandala and Pirakka, near Zakho in north Iraq. In Levo they built a new church dedicated to St. Abraham. The largest community of "Margaye" outside the Middle East is now in Melbourne, Australia. Margaye people are known to pronounce words that have a T sound with an S, so for instance "beta" ('house') will be "besa". This is a feature also present in the Senaya dialect, an Assyrian variety based in Iranian Kurdistan.

=== Hakkari Province ===
The following is a list of Assyrian settlements in the Hakkari region prior to the Assyrian genocide of 1914. The Assyrian settlements in this region were divided into two groups, ashiret and rayyat. The ashiret settlements belonged to the five semi-independent tribes of Tyari, Tkhuma, Baz, Jilu, and Dez with each tribe presiding over its own district. The rayyat settlements were vassals to either the ashiret tribes or to Kurdish chieftains.

Villages in the Lower Tyari District (Ashiret)

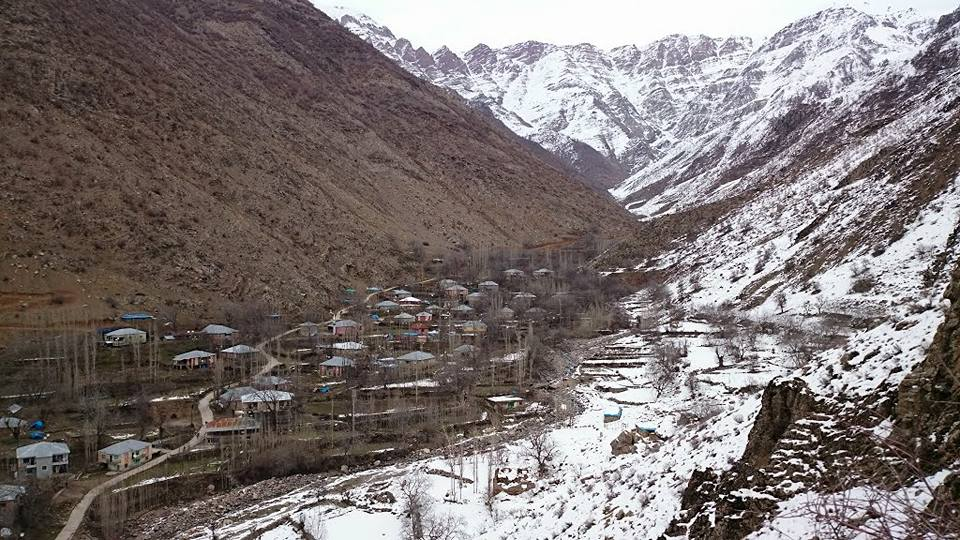
Snowfall in Halmon village.

- Arosh. The Sirnak portion is known as Ārosh Taxtayta (Lower Arosh) and the Hakkari part is called Ārosh Alayta (Upper Arosh), which is now designated as Yukariarus, a small hamlet. Due to the close proximity of the tribes, some Arosh people have mixed with those in Geramon, which lies a few kilometers north of the tribe, and they may be confused for them.
- Ashita was home to nearly 800 families with a church dedicated to St. George and a shrine to St. Abraham. The village was divided into the following quarters: Isroor, Meweetha, Matha d-'Umra (Khateebin), Chammaneh and Chammaneh Khtaitha. The name Ashitha comes from the Assyrian word meaning "avalanche", because a part of the village is prone to that natural phenomenon. Even the modern Turkish name of the village, Çığlı, comes from the Turkish word Çığ, meaning "avalanche". In 1922, the Assyrians of Ashitha were mostly resettled in villages of Nineveh Governorate and Dohuk provinces in northern Iraq, mainly in Sharafiya, Bakhetme and Sarsing. Furthermore, most Tyari Assyrians tend to be from Ashita (Ashetnaye) and it is one of the most common Assyrian tribe.
- Bet Alata (Belāthā) was home to 100 families, and was also the village where the chiefs of Lower Tyare resided. Belatha is held to be one of the four original villages of the Tyare districts. Many Assyrians from the districts of Upper Tyare and Tkhuma, as well as the Be-Nikho and Be-Majje clans of Ashitha, have their heritage here. Above the village was the ancient monastery of St. Babai, which still stands today. The name Belatha comes from the Syriac phrase "Beth-'Allatha," meaning "place of fruits" or "place of crops". It may also derive from the Syriac phrase "Beth-'Ilyatha," meaning "place of the heights". The Assyrian dance "Belati" originate from this village. After 1924, Assyrians from Belatha settled in several villages of north of Amadiya and in the Nahla valley in the district of 'Aqrah in Iraq. In the 1960s, the Assyrians of Chamme-Sineh were forced out by Kurds and eventually resettled in the nearby village of Kashkawa. Unlike other Lower Tyari dialects, they would say didan, as instead of diyen for "our" (possessive plural).
- Bet Ragula
- Bet Zizo
- Challuk
- Chamba d'Bet Susina
- Chire Rezan
- Gérāmon was home to more than 80 households, containing a 6th-century church that was dedicated to St. John the Arab. From 1922 onward, the Assyrians of Geramon immigrated to Iraq. Its inhabitants are called Geresenayeh. Due to its very close proximity to Halmon, the tribes share a cultural symbiosis and have an affinity towards each other. As such, many Assyrians from Iraq fallaciously consider Halmonaye as being Geresnaye, whereas those from Syria, conversely, label people from Geramon as Halmonaye. Moreover, Aroshnaye are a tribe within their vicinity who may also be confused for either of them.
- Halmun is around 500 meters away from Geramon (Yarma, which is now part of Andaç as well) and, as such, the two groups are affiliated with each other and have intermarried. The village consisted of over 60 households, with a 4th century church dedicated to St. Shmuni. The Assyrians of Halmon were eventually settled in the village of Cham-Suske, in the Dohuk province of northern Iraq, in 1922, after violence and persecution. Afterwards, some were resettled in the village of Tell-Jum'ah in 1935. There are many Assyrian songs that have the word Halmon in their titles and lyrics. The songs are usually associated with the Assyrian folk dance. Adwar Mousa is a prominent Assyrian singer and lyricist from Halmon. Halmonites are the only speakers who have retained the classical Syriac diphthong [eɪ̯] in words like psheyna ("greetings") and kheyla ("power"), where in other dialects and also Standard Assyrian speech (or Iraqi Koine), the monophthong /ɛ/ is used instead. Nonetheless, in formal speech, hymns and some forms of nationalistic music, /ɛ/ may be diphthongized in Standard Assyrian as well.
- Hur
- Kurhe
- Karukta
- Lagippa
- Lizan contained 80 households with an ancient church dedicated to St. George. The Assyrians of Lizan were forced out of their village in 1915 and again in 1924. The village was known for its famous bridge, which spanned the Upper Zab River between Lizan and the Kurdish village of Geyman. As such, the contemporary Turkish name for the village means "bridged". Currently, the church of St. George in Lizan is being used as a barracks by the Turkish military, which supervises the nearby Kurdish village of Geyman, as well as the Iraqi border nearby. The Assyrians of Lizan originated from the village of Matha d-Qasra (Qasran, now known as Güllüce). After 1925 the Assyrians of Lizan were resettled in the districts of Barwari-Bala and Nahla in northern Iraq's Dohuk and Ninawa governorates.
- Mata d'Qasra
- Minyānish was one of the largest villages in Lower Tyāré inhabited by more than 100 menages. The four ancient churches of the village were dedicated to the Virgin Mary, St. Shmuni, Rabbān Yāqu and Rabbān Sāhdā. The Assyrians of Minyānish are believed to originate from the ancient village of Lagippā, also in Lower Tyāré, and they must have settled there sometime prior to the 10th century, over 1,000 years ago. After 1924, the Assyrians of Minyānish were settled in northern Iraq. Their most important settlement there, right now, is the village of Kashkāwā in the Nahlā Valley north of the town of 'Aqrah (Akre). Unlike the other Lower Tyari tribes, they use "sh" sound instead of "th" or "t" – So "beta" (house) will be "besha".
- Ragula d'Salabakkan
- Shurd
- Umra Tahktaya
- Zarni
- Zawita. Zawita in Northern Iraq was named after this village, after the Assyrians settled there.

Villages in the Upper Tyari and Walto Districts (Ashiret and Rayyat)

- Aina d'Alile
- Bet Dalyata
- Bet Mariggo
- Bet Nahra
- Bet Zraqo
- Chamba d'Bet Eliya
- Chamba d'Hasso
- Chamba Khadta
- Chamba d'Kurkhe
- Chamba d'Malik was home to more than 60 households and was the residence of the Maliks of Upper Tyare 'Most notifiable the MalikIsmail Family'. The ancient church in was dedicated to St. Sergius the Martyr (Mar Sargis). There was also a monastery near the village dedicated to St. Abraham, where the Chaldean Catholic bishop Mar Abraham d-Bet Mar Shimun died in 1915. In 1935, the Assyrians of Chamba d-Malik ("Chammanaye") were relocated in the village of Tell-Tamr. There they built a new church dedicated to St. Sergius and St. George, which belongs to the Ancient Church of the East.
- Chamba d'Nene
- Chamba d'Kurdaye
- Dadosh
- Darawa (Ishte d'Nahra)
- Dura Ellaya
- Jemiata
- Khadiana
- Ko
- Mabbuwa
- Ma'lota d'Malik
- Mata d'Mart Maryam
- Mazra'a
- Mazra'a d'Qelayata
- Mratita
- Qelayata
- Resha d'Nahra was inhabited by roughly 50 households and its church was dedicated to the Virgin Mary. In 1935, most of the Assyrians of Khidhyana and Resha d-Nahra were resettled in the village of Tell Nasri. There, with other Assyrians from the Walto valley, they built a new church dedicated to the Virgin Mary.
- Roma Smoqa
- Rumta
- Saraspidon
- Serta was home to at least 80 households. It was situated in the district of Walto, and its church was dedicated to St. John. The Assyrians of Sirta were mostly resettled in the village of Tell-Nasri, along the Khabur River in Syria, in 1935. There, they inhabit their own neighbourhood in a village populated only by other Assyrians from the Walto district.
- Shwawuta
- Siyador
- Zorawa

The valley of Upper Tyare straddles the banks of the Upper Zab River. Up until 1915, this valley contained 20 purely Assyrian settlements (not including those in side valleys, such as Koh, Malota d-Malik, Mabbuwa, Rumta, Qallayatha, Sarspidho, etc.). At that time, these 20 settlements contained as much as 450 Assyrian families with 8 ancient churches. The dialects of the Assyrians in the Upper Tyari area, unlike those in Lower Tyari, generally use an "sh" sound instead of "th" for words like "beta" ("besha"), meaning "house." The descendants of Assyrians from the Upper Tyare valley now live in the village of Kore-Gavana in northern Iraq's Dohuk province, as well as the villages of Tell-Tamr and Tell Tawil on the banks of the Khabur River in Syria.

The Assyrian settlements in the Upper Zab valley of Uper Tyare included: Zorawa, Chamba d-Badal, Dizza, Chamba Khadta (Chamba d-Mira), Darawa d-Walto, Chamba d-Hasso, Roma Smoqa, Be-Mariggo, Chamba d-Kurkhe, Dadosh, Chamba d-Tuwan, Be-Dalyatha, Chamba d-Malik, Be-Samano, Chamba d-Rora, Mazra d-Rumta, Chamba d-Be-Eliya, Chamba d-Qurdaye and Siyadhor.

Villages in the Tkhuma District (Ashiret)

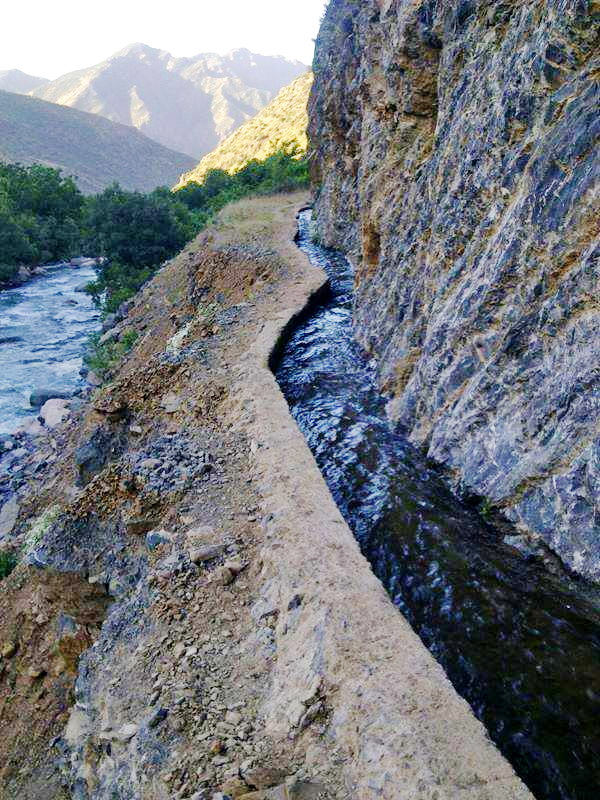
An ancient water channel in the village of Berijaye

- Bet Arijai (Berijaye) contained three churches, the largest of which was dedicated to St. Cyriacus (Mar Quryaqus), located outside the village near a water-powered mill - called Dêra Laşawê by local Kurds today. The others were dedicated to St. George (Mar Gewargis) and St. Jonah. It was one of the last villages to capitulate on 15 September 1915, when the Assyrians were forced out of Hakkari by Ottoman troops and their Kurdish allies. The Assyrians of Berijaye were mostly settled in the hamlet of Tell-Mukhadah, along the Khabur River in Syria, in 1935. There they built a new church dedicated to St. Cyriacus.
- Gissa contained 75 families and featured an ancient church dedicated to the 4th century Martyr Saint and Catholicos Mar Shim'on Bar-Sabba'e. It was one of the last villages to surrender on 15 September 1915, when the Assyrians were forced out of Hakkari by Ottoman troops and their Kurdish allies. The Assyrians of Gissa were mostly settled in the village of Tell-Kharitah in 1935.
- Gundikta was home to 350 families. Its ancient church was dedicated to St. Ananias of the Oaths (Beth-Khanya d-Momatha). Local Kurds now know the church as Derâ Miskin. This church was notable for a cross called the "Oath Cross". The belief was that if someone incorrectly swore an oath on this cross they would suddenly die. The Assyrians of Gundiktha speak a dialect similar to Tyari people. They mostly settled in the villages of Tell-Sakrah and Tell-Shamah in 1935. In each village they built a church dedicated to St. Ananias.
- Khani
- Mazra'a was home to 300 families before Seyfo. Its Turkish name today is Yaylak. Its spiritual centre was the 4th century Monastery of Rabban Pithyon, which was also a highly regarded place of pilgrimage across the Hakkari highlands, famed for its golden cross. This monastery is located between Mazra'ya and nearby Tkhuma Gawaya, and is known to local Kurds as Derâ Berujî. It was established by the monk Rabban Pithyon, who was a nephew and disciple of St. Eugene. The Assyrians of Mazra'ya were mostly settled in the villages of Tell-Rumman Tahtani and Tell-Wardiyat, along the Khabur River in Syria, in 1935.
- Tkhuma Gawaya was the considered the hub of the Tkhuma Assyrian tribal district. Prior to the First World War it was a purely Assyrian settlement, inhabited by 650 Assyrian families. It was also home to an ancient church dedicated to St. Shallita, and was the residence of the chieftains or maliks of Tkhuma. The Assyrians of Tkhuma Gawaya were mostly resettled in the villages of Tell-Hirmiz and Umm-Ghargan in 1935. In Tell-Hirmiz, a new church dedicated to St. Shallita was bult.

Villages in the Baz District (Ashiret)

- Argeb
- Bet Salam
- Mata Takhtaita
- Orwantus
- Qojija
- Shwawuta

Villages in the Jilu District (Ashiret)

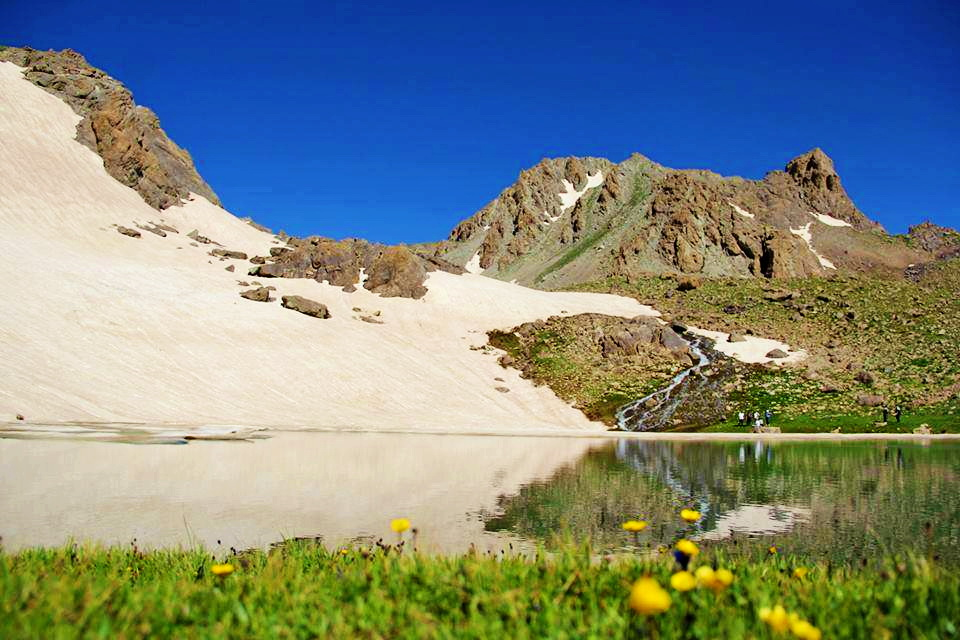
Lake nestled by orchards and a mountain in Jilu.

- Alsan was native to roughly 100 households with an ancient church dedicated to St. Michael.
- Ammod
- Bet Boqra
- Bubawa
- Marmuria
- Mata d'Mar Zaya was a purely Assyrian settlement occupied by 70 households before 1915. Its ancient church was built by St. Zaya and his disciple St. Tavor in 427 AD. For centuries the village served as the seat of the Mar Sargis metropolitan bishops of Jilu, whose jurisdiction also extended as far as the districts of Baz, Tkhuma and Rekan. The church of Sts. Zay'a and Tavor served as their cathedral. The Assyrians of Mata d-Mar Zay'a were mostly settled in the village of Khirsheniya, in the Dohuk province of north Iraq, in 1922. Most of them, however, went on to create urban neighbourhoods, such as the Jilu Camp (Camp al-Sikak) in Baghdad, Jilo Mahallesi in Kirkuk and Sarbaz in Tehran.
- Mata d'Oryaye
- Matriya
- Medhi was a mixed settlement of Assyrians and Kurds under the jurisdiction of Greater Jilu. Before 1915 there were about 10 Assyrian households in that village.
- Muspiran
- Nahra
- Nirek
- Omut
- Ore
- Samsekke
- Sarpel
- Saten was an equally mixed Assyrian-Kurdish settlement. The Upper and Middle sections of the village were occupied by Kurds, the Lower part was populated solely by Assyrians. At that time, it was home to more than 300 people with an ancient church dedicated to St. Mārī the Apostle and Proselytiser of the East, and a village school run by the local Chaldean Catholic priest. The church was significant as being the only one in the Hakkâri highlands dedicated to that particular saint, and it was believed to have been built in the 3rd or 4th century. Also near the village was a mountain shrine called Mārī'm, sacrosanct to both Christian Assyrians and Muslim Kurds alike.
- Talana
- Zir
- Zirine

Villages in the Dez, Shwawuta, and Billijnaye Districts (Ashiret and Rayyat)

- Alas
- Alogippa
- Aqose
- Awert
- Bet Respi (a)
- Bet Respi (b)
- Bet Shammasha
- Chiri Chara
- Chulchen
- Daden
- Dairikki
- Derres
- Golozor
- Kursen. Prior to 1915, Kursin was a purely Assyrian settlement with 35 households and an ancient church dedicated to St. Sava.
- Mades
- Makita
- Mar Quriaqos was home to about 5 households, with an ancient church dedicated to St. Cyriacus. The church was well known for its healing properties, and maniacal people would often be locked inside it overnight to be healed. In 1935, many Assyrians from Diz were settled in the villages of Tell-Balu'ah and Qabr-Shamiyah, on the banks of the Khabur River in Syria. Others can now be found in Russia and other countries of the Assyrian diaspora.
- Nauberi
- Rabban Dadisho was home to about 20 households, with a 4th-century ancient monastery dedicated to Rabban Dadishu (the monk, St. Dad-Isho').
- Saqerran
- Saramos was home to about 20 households, with an ancient church dedicated to St. George.
- Shwawuta
- Suwwa was home to more than 15 households, with an ancient church dedicated to the Virgin Mary.

In 1935, many Assyrians from Diz were settled in the villages of Tell-Balu'ah and Qabr-Shamiyah, on the banks of the Khabur River in Syria. They can also be found in Moscow, Taganrog, Vladikavkaz and the North Caucasus region of Russia, as well as in Ukraine.

Villages in the Liwan and Norduz Districts (Rayyat)

- Bailekan
- Billi
- Daira d'Zengel
- Erke
- Gokhikki
- Khandaqe
- Khargel
- Kanunta
- Marwanan
- Mata d'Umra
- Nogwizan
- Parhilan
- Sekunis
- Tel Jeri
- Ulaman
- Zaranis

Villages in the Qodchanis & Siwine Districts (Rayyat)

- Akhwanis
- Bet Hajij
- Bet Nano
- Charos
- Espen
- Karme
- Khardalanis
- Kigar
- Nerwa
- Oret
- Pekhen
- Qodchanis
- Qotranis
- Quranis
- Sallan
- Shmuninis
- Siwine
- Sorlines
- Tarmel
- Tirqonis

The village of Qudshanis, traditionally called Qodchanis (and also spelled Qudshanes, Kotchanes, Qochanis or Kocanis), located in Konak, Hakkari, was home to the family of the Catholicos-Patriarch of the Church of the East - the Shimun XIX Benyamin. Its main church of St. Shallita, built at the turn of the 17th century, therefore served as the patriarchal cathedral of the Church of the East from its founding in 1692 until 1918. The neighboring tribes were subservient to the Patriarch, based in Qochanis, and paid him taxes, with which the patriarch then gave to the Ottomans. The confederation was in effect almost like a vassal state ruled by the Ottoman Empire, and even then the Assyrians were not subservient to the Sultan, but rather the Patriarch. Hence why upon his declaration of war in 1915 the tribes of the region immediately went into open rebellion against the Turks before they were forced off of their ancestral lands in the Assyrian Genocide, never to return again. The village was founded in 1672 by Chaldean Catholics from the city of Amida, who upon settling here broke off with the Catholic church and founded a new branch of the Assyrian Church of the East in 1692, ruled by the Shimun line. From that point on the village functioned as the de facto capital of the Assyrian tribes in the region. The Patriarch residing in the Church of Mār Shalīṭa enjoyed both spiritual and political power over his subjects. Since priests were required to remain celibates the patriarchy moved from uncle to nephew. This system came to be known as Nāṭar Kursyā (ܢܛܪ ܟܘܪܣܝܐ "Guardian of the throne"), and by the 19th century this system was applied to all dioceses of Hakkari. A group of Assyrians from Qudshanis settled in the villages of Tell-Hufyan and Tell-Damsheej, along the Khabur River in Syria, in 1935. In Tell-Hufyan they built a new church dedicated to St. Shallita, and in Tell-Damsheej they built a new church dedicated to St. John.

Qotranis and Khardalanis, located in Ördekli ve Tepeli, Hakkari, had about 30 households with ancient churches dedicated to St. George and the Virgin Mary. Khardalanis was inhabited by roughly 20 households with an ancient church. In 1935, many Assyrians from Upper Barwar were resettled in the village of Tel Misas, on the banks of the Khabur River in Syria. A number of them also now live in Russia, in the cities of Moscow, St. Petersburg, Rostov-on-Don, as well as in the North Caucasus and Volga regions.

Villages in the Chal, Raikan, & Tal Districts (Rayyat)

- Arewun
- Bet Alata
- Bet Aziza was home to nearly 50 households prior to 1915, with two ancient churches. The largest and most important of these was dedicated to St. George. The village takes its name from the historic figure of King Aziz of Tal, who lived in the 4th-5th centuries AD and was the father of St. Talya (Mar Tlaye). In 1935, many Assyrians from Be-Aziza, who are called "Aziznaye", were resettled, with other Assyrians from Tal, in the village of Tell-Tal, on the banks of the Khabur River in Syria.
- Bet Biyya
- Bet Daire
- Bet Iqta
- Bet Quraye
- Bet Shuqa
- Erbesh
- Erk
- Estep
- Gebba
- Hish
- Merkanish
- Qo
- Rebbat
- Shawreza
- Talana

Villages in the Gawar District (Rayyat)

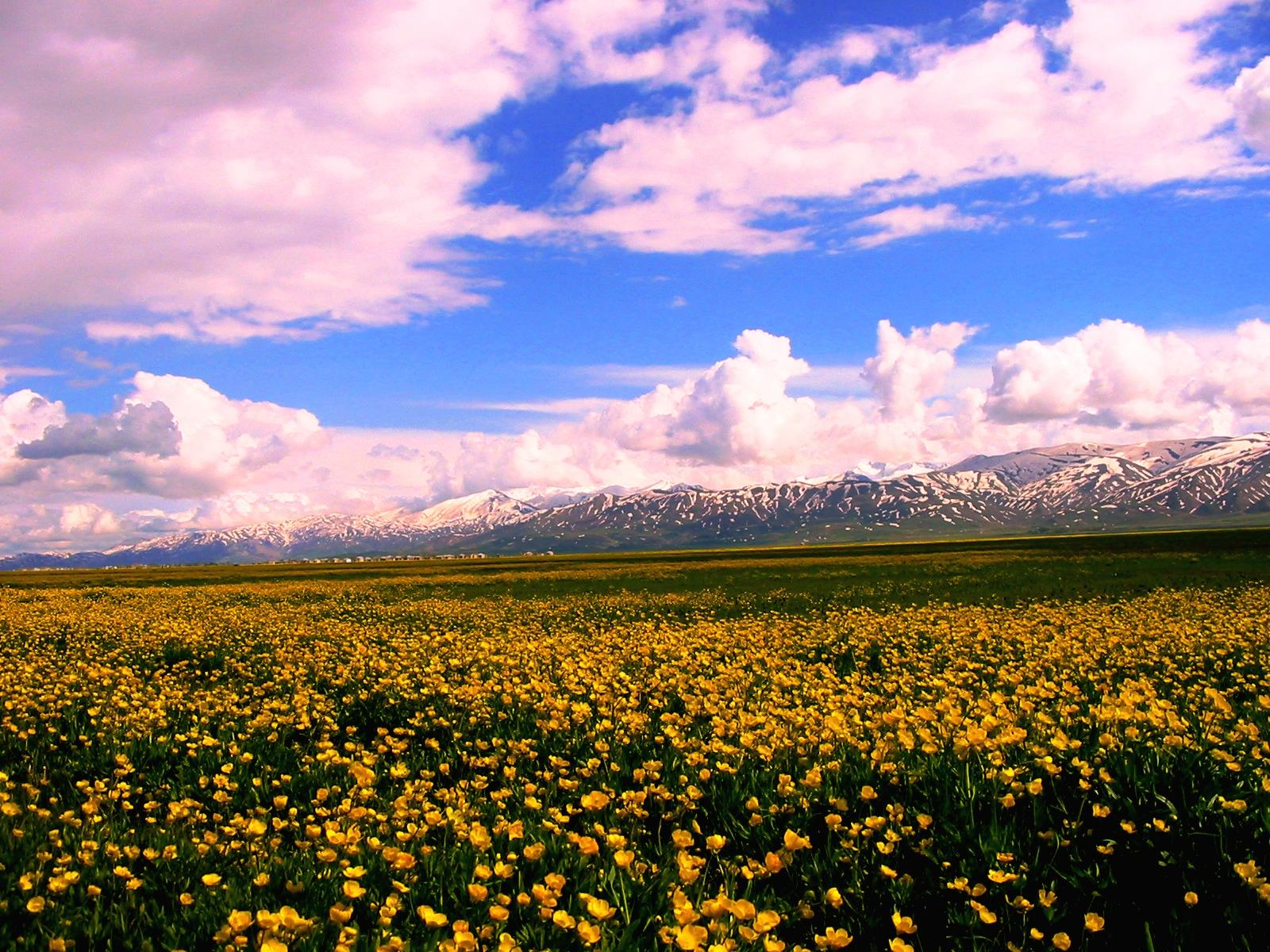
Gawar plain blooming in springtime.

- Bashirga
- Bet Rberre
- Dara
- Darawa
- Diza Gawar
- Gagoran
- Karpel
- Khulkhus
- Kiyyet
- Maken Awa
- Manunan
- Memekkan
- Page
- Pa'ilan
- Pirzalan
- Qadiyan
- Qardiwar
- Sardasht
- Sinawa
- Urisha
- Wazirawa
- Zirkanis
- Zizan

Located in Ovası and Dereiçi in Yüksekova, the Gawar plain was home to over 35 Assyrian villages, 30 churches and about 1,000 households up until 1915. The district centre was the town of Dizza d-Gawar (modern-day Yüksekova). People of Jilu and Gawar were very consanguineous and had close ties with each other, and speak the same dialect of Neo Aramaic. However, Jilu is to the east, while Gawar is more proximate to the Tkhuma or Baz. Urisha was a purely Assyrian settlement prior to 1915, with a population of more than 20 households. Its church was dedicated to St. Sava the Physician, and was a major centre of pilgrimage in the Gawar Plain. A group of Assyrians from Gawar and Urisha settled in the villages of Tell-Maghas and Tell-Jadaya, along the Khabur River in Syria, in 1935. Others settled in Northern Iraq.

Villages in the Albaq, Derrenaye, Khananis, and Artushi Kurdish Districts (Rayyat)

- Alamiyyan
- Ates
- Ayyel
- Barwes
- Basan
- Bet Zeqte
- Burduk
- Erdshi
- Gezna
- Hoze
- Khalila
- Khananis Ellaita
- Khananis Takhtaita
- Kharaban
- Kharalun
- Mar Behisho
- Menjilawa
- Parrashin
- Pusan
- Ozan
- Qalanis. Prior to 1915 it was a purely Assyrian settlement, home to more than 25 households with three churches.
- Sharinis
- Silmuan

Villages in the Shemsdin District (Rayyat)

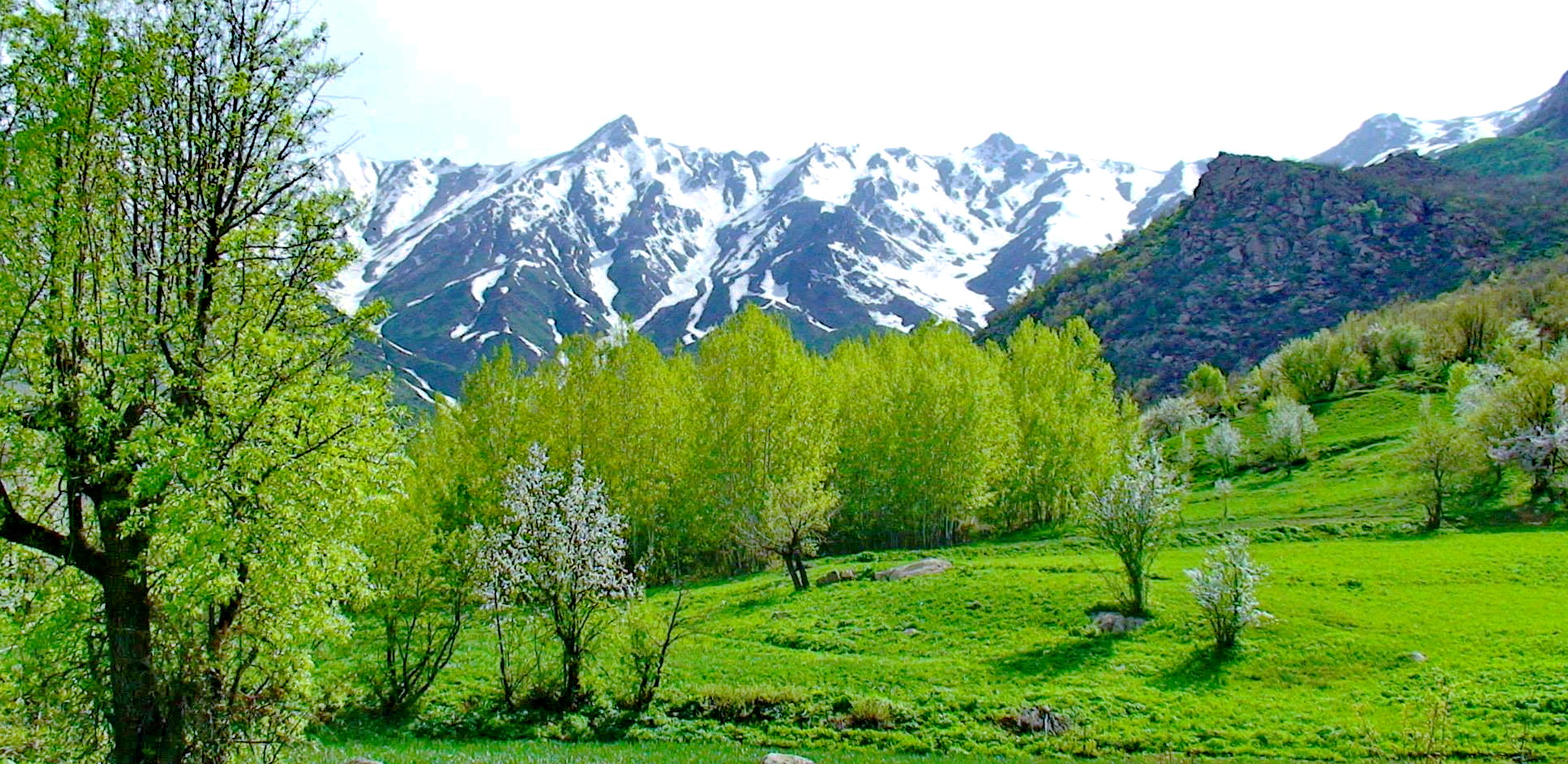
The meadows of Shaput.

- Baituta
- Balqan
- Bet Babe
- Bet Daiwe (Bé-Dīwé) was home to upwards of 25 households with two ancient churches dedicated to St. John the Baptist and St. Cyriacus, as well as a shrine to St. 'Avdā. The name Bé-Dīwé is Assyrian, and derives from the Syriac or Aramaic phrase Beth-Dīvé, meaning, "Home of the Wolves". In 1922 the Assyrians of Bé-Dīwé (Bādūnāyé) were mostly resettled in villages of Iraq's Erbil governorate. Some of them were later resettled in the village of Fell-Faydhah, on the banks of the Khabur River in Syria, in 1935.
- Bet Garde
- Bet Tunyo
- Dara
- Daron
- Duri
- Duru
- Gargane
- Halana
- Harbunan
- Isira
- Kek Perzan
- Mar Denkha
- Marta
- Nairdusha
- Qatuna
- Rustaqa was the spiritual capital of the Nochiya district's Assyrian Christians. Before 1915 it was a purely Assyrian settlement inhabited by 25 households, including that of the Matran family. It was both home to a 5th century monastery dedicated to St. Isho', as well as the seat of the Mar Khnanishu metropolitans of the Church of the East. Rustaqa was the birthplace of St. Mar Yosip Khnanishu. The Assyrians of Rustaqa were mostly settled in the village of Harir, in Erbil province of north Iraq, in 1922.
- Sarunis was home to as much as 40 households with an ancient church ordained to the Virgin Mary, Mother of Christ. In 1922 the Assyrians of Sarunis were mostly resettled in the villages of Hinnare and Darbandoke in Iraq's Erbil province. Some of them were later relocated in the village of Fell-Faydhah in 1935.
- Shaput (Shapatan) was flecked with more than 30 Assyrian communities preceding 1915. At that time, over 700 Assyrian families dwelled there, and they had approximately 34 churches and monasteries. The name Shapatan goes back to ancient times, when it was a province of the Assyrian Empire. The Assyrians of Nochiya were mostly settled in villages of Erbil province in northern Iraq, such as Diyana, Hawdiyan, Harir, Batas and Darbandoke, in 1922. A few relocated in the village of Tell-Faydah in 1935.
- Sursire
- Talana
- Tīs had the ancient monastery of Mār Dinkhā. The last bishop of this family was killed by invading Ottoman personnel outside the village of Charbash, near Urmia (Iran), in February 1915, during the Assyrian Genocide. The former Catholicos-Patriarch of the Assyrian Church of the East, Mar Dinkha IV, belongs to this family, and Tīs is his ancestral village. In 1922 the Assyrians of Tīs and 'Umra were mostly relocated in the village of Darbandoke in Iraq's Erbil province. Some of them were later resettled in the village of Fell-Faydhah in 1935.

Villages in the Baradost, Tergawar, & Mergawar Districts (Rayyat)

- Anbi
- Balulan
- Biteme
- Darband
- Dizgari
- Gangajin
- Gundukmalaya
- Haki
- Halbi
- Hbashkube
- Heshmawa
- Hulutan
- Hurana
- Husar
- Irima
- Nargi
- Pasta
- Qaloga
- Qurana
- Razga
- Rusna
- Salona
- Shaikhani
- Sihani
- Susnawa
- Tuleki
- Tulu
- Urtira
- Uwasu
- Zangilan
- Ziruwa

Villages in the Taimar District (Rayyat)

- Aghjacha
- Armanis
- Gadalawa
- Hawsheshur
- Kharabsorik
- Kharashik
- Khinno
- Pokhanis
- Rushan
- Satibak
- Seel
- Serai
- Toan

== Armenia ==
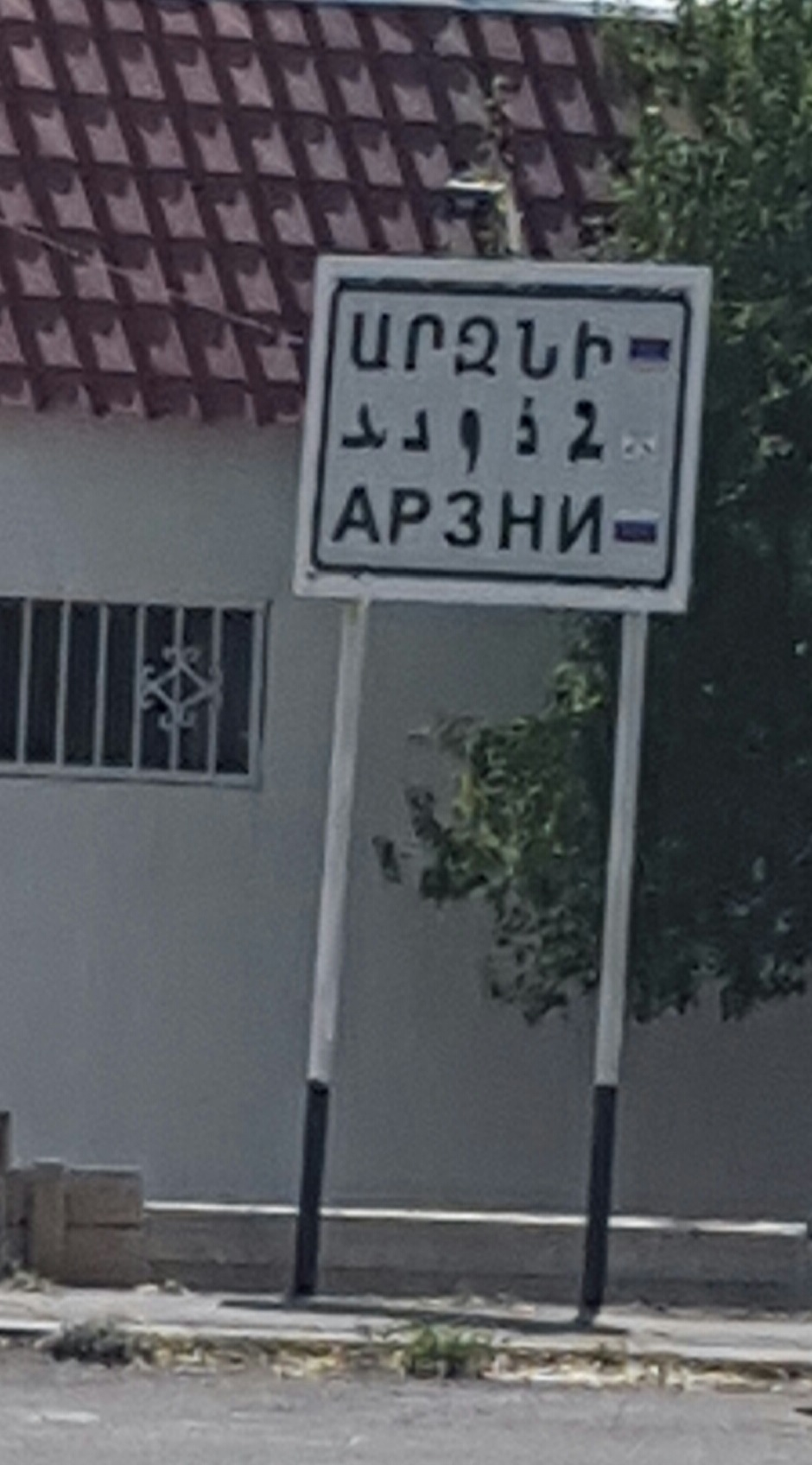
A multilingual (Armenian, Assyrian, Russian) sign at the entrance of Arzni

The Assyrian population in Armenia is mainly rural. Out of 3,409 Assyrians in Armenia 2,885 (84.6%) was rural and 524 (15.4%) urban. According to the Council of Europe European Charter for Regional or Minority Languages there were four rural settlements with significant Assyrian population.

=== Ararat Province ===
1. Verin Dvin - Assyrians and Armenians
2. Dimitrov - Assyrians and Armenians

=== Armavir Province ===
1. Nor Artagers - Assyrians, Armenians and Yazidis

=== Kotayk Province ===
1. Arzni - Assyrians and Armenians

== See also ==
- List of Assyrian tribes
- Assyrian diaspora
- Assyrian people
- Tur Abdin
- Barwari
- Hakkari
- Nineveh Plains
- Nahla valley
- Sapna valley

== Bibliography ==
- Alexander, V (1994) [1994], The First Civilization, Victor Alexander, ISBN 978-1-4486-7089-5
- Eshoo, Majed (2004). Mary Challita (ed.). The Fate Of Assyrian Villages Annexed To Today's Dohuk Governorate In Iraq And The Conditions In These Villages Following The Establishment Of The Iraqi State In 1921.
- Meho, Lokman I.; Maglaughlin, Kelly L. (2001). Kurdish Culture and Society: An Annotated Bibliography. Greenwood Publishing Group. ISBN 9780313315435.
- Wilmshurst, David (2000). The ecclesiastical organisation of the Church of the East, 1318-1913. University of Virginia: Peeters. ISBN 9782877235037.
