= Odisho Moshe =

Odisho Moshe is an Assyrian singer, based in Sweden. He released four albums between 2003 and 2011, and a number of singles since then. He is also a play writer and has worked with various theater groups within the Assyrian community.

He is known to have performed in a number of Assyrian events including the 6761 Akitu celebrations and the founding of Assyrian Democratic Movement anniversary in Nahla in 2011.
