= Bandwaya =

- village
- Location in Iraq
- Coordinates (36.733863, 43.037114): 37°02′N 43°06′E
- Country: Iraq
- Province: Ninawa
- District: Tel Keppe

Bandwaya is a village located in the Tel Keppe District of Ninawa Province, Iraq.

== Etymology ==
The village's name is a Syriac contraction of "Bet Handwaya" meaning "house [land of] the watermelon," possibly due to its frequent cultivation of the fruit or its abundance there. The second element literally translates to "Indian"; watermelons were historically named after the subcontinent in several languages: Arabic سندية sindiyya "of Sindh" (which passed into Spanish sandía); Persian هندوانه hendevâne "of India", and more.

== History ==
The first mention of Bandwaya occurred in a 12th-century manuscript written by a priest named Ishaq from the town of Baa'shika, in which a blind man from "Behendwaya village" was recorded. Assyrians from Alqosh were known to have settled in Bandwaya. Later on, Assyrian refugees arrived in the village from Turkey to supplement the local Assyrian population. The village existed as such up until being occupied by Arabs in the 1970s.

== See also ==
- List of Assyrian settlements
