= Sharafiya =

Sharafiya ܫܲܪܦ̮ܝܼܵܐ شرفية
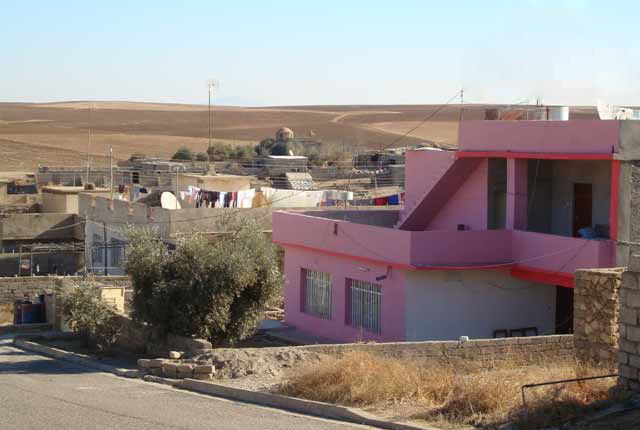

- Location within Iraq
- Coordinates: 36°41′20″N 43°5′46″E
- Country: Iraq
- Governorate: Nineveh
- District: Tel Kaif

Population
  - Total: 500
- Time zone: GMT +3

Sharafiya (Syriac: ܫܲܪܦ̮ܝܼܵܐ, romanized: šarfīyā, Arabic: شرفية, romanized: šarafiyya, Kurdish: شەرەفیە, romanized: şerefye) is a village in the Nineveh Plains of northern Iraq, a sub-district of the Tel Kaif District situated 40 km northwest of the city of Mosul and is on the main road that connects Mosul to Alqosh, which it is only 5 kilometers south of.

Prior to its destruction by the Islamic State, it was home to about 400 families. After the defeat of the Islamic State in the region by the Kurdish Peshmerga, the village's Church of St. George was restored and baptisms of infants resumed in January 2018.

== See also ==
- List of Assyrian settlements
- Proposals for Assyrian autonomy in Iraq
- Assyrians in Iraq
- Yazidis in Iraq
