= Gulpashan =

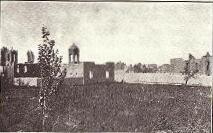
Ruins of Gulpashan after the first world war.

Golpashan was an Assyrian Christian town located on the western shore of Lake Urmia, Iran. The town was once one of the most prosperous towns in Urmia plains but was destroyed and abandoned in 1918. The site is now occupied by the village of Gol Pashin.

== History ==
It is not known exactly when Assyrians first settled in Golpashan but they did found the village. They have continuously inhabited the land since pre-recorded history.

This village played a dramatic part in the Assyrian genocide during and after World War I. It was attacked in February 1915 by units of the Ottoman Army. Another attack in 1918 by bands of Kurds destroyed the settlement completely.

== Churches ==
Golpashan has at least three main churches:

- Mar Sehyon (St. Zion) Assyrian Church of the East
- Mar Gewargis Assyrian Chaldean Catholic Church
- St. Mary Assyrian Evangelical Church

== People from Golpashan ==
- Eden Naby Assyrian historian.

== See also ==
- Assyrians in Iran
- List of Assyrian settlements
- List of Assyrian villages
