= Balowlan =

Village in West Azerbaijan province, Iran

Balowlan Persian: بالولان
- Village
- Location within Iran
- Coordinates: 37°32′47″N 44°46′07″E
- Country: Iran
- Province: West Azerbaijan
- County: Urmia
- District: Silvaneh
- Rural District: Targavar

Population (2016)
  - Total: 351
- Time zone: UTC+3:30 (IRST)

Balowlan (Persian: بالولان, romanized: Bālowlān; Syriac: Bālūlan) (Note: Also known as Ba‘lūlan and Baloulan.) is a village in Targavar Rural District of Silvaneh District in Urmia County, West Azerbaijan province, Iran.

== History ==
Bālūlan (today called Balowlan) is tentatively identified with the village of Beʿellawin from which the priest-scribe Wardā (d. 1757) came. A manuscript was copied at the Church of Mart Maryam, Mār Thomas, and Mār Yōḥannān at Bālūlan in 1824 by the archdeacon Gīwārgīs, son of Zayʿā, son of the priest Lagin, of the family of the bishop Yōḥannān. In 1877, Bālūlan was inhabited by 30 Church of the East Christian families and had one church. The Christians of Bālūlan helped Assyrian and Armenian refugees who had fled the Hamidian massacres. The deacon Ablaḥad of Bālūlan was killed helping to repel a Kurdish attack on Mawānā in 1903. It was reported in 1910 that Bālūlan had been seized by Kurds and the village's Christian population had taken refuge at Urmia. Prior to the First World War, there were 200 Assyrian houses at Bālūlan, as per the list presented by Agha Petros to the Lausanne Peace Conference in 1922. On 1 October 1914, Turco-Kurdish troops set fire to the village amidst the Sayfo and the inhabitants fled to Urmia.

== Demographics ==
=== Population ===
At the time of the 2006 National Census, the village's population was 309 in 57 households. The following census in 2011 counted 253 people in 56 households. The 2016 census measured the population of the village as 351 people in 85 households.

== See also ==
- St. Thomas Church, Balowlan

== Bibliography ==
- Al-Jeloo, Nicholas (2015). "Persian Christians: Assyrian art and architecture of Urmia as an example of regional cultural expression". Parole de l’Orient. 40: 13–27.
- Gaunt, David (2006). Massacres, Resistance, Protectors: Muslim-Christian Relations in Eastern Anatolia during World War I. Gorgias Press.
- Hellot-Bellier, Florence (2017). "The Resistance of Urmia Assyrians to Violence at the Beginning of the Twentieth Century". In David Gaunt; Naures Atto; Soner O. Barthoma (eds.). Let Them Not Return: Sayfo – The Genocide against the Assyrian, Syriac and Chaldean Christians in the Ottoman Empire (PDF). pp. 70–99.
- Wilmshurst, David (2000). The Ecclesiastical Organisation of the Church of the East, 1318–1913 (PDF). Peeters Publishers.
- Yacoub, Joseph (2016). Year of the Sword: The Assyrian Christian Genocide, A History. Translated by James Ferguson. Oxford University Press.
