= Eden Naby =

Iranian cultural historian

Eden Naby (born 1942) is an Assyrian-Iranian cultural historian of Central Asia and the Middle East. She was born in the once important Assyrian town of Golpashan, located outside Urmia in Iran. Eden Naby has conducted research, taught and published on minority issues in countries from Turkey to Xinjiang. Her work on Afghanistan and on the Assyrians stands out in the field of cultural survival. She was married to Richard Frye (1975) and they had one son, Nels Frye.

After graduating Temple University in 1964 for her undergraduate degree, she served in the Peace Corps in Afghanistan, and after receiving her PhD (1975, Columbia University) she taught at Pahlavi University in Shiraz, Iran from 1975 to 1977. In 1980, she led a CBS 60 Minutes team for the first ever filming of the Soviet invasion of Afghanistan. She was featured in Charlie Wilson's War (2008) with Dan Rather.

Naby has devoted her time since 1979 to establishing endowments at United States universities to promote the preservation of Assyrian archives, publishing, and lectures. While limited in principal, these endowments, especially at Harvard University, lay the basis for the preservation of research materials, especially in diaspora. Naby has taught as a visiting scholar at various universities including Columbia University, Harvard University, University of Wisconsin - Madison, and University of Massachusetts - Amherst.

Among her writings are many articles in the Assyrian Star (2001–2007) aimed at eliciting knowledge about Assyrian culture from knowledgeable members of the community. She has also mounted three exhibits (Harvard, 1998, 1999, Boston Public Library 2005) using Assyrian family photographs and the Harvard archives to illustrate 19th-20th century Assyrian history. In 2014, she curated “Animating the Word: The Calligraphic Legacy of Iran’s Religious Minorities” Tally Beck Contemporary Gallery (New York) (A calligraphy exhibit from Iran's Zoroastrian, Jewish, Assyrian and Armenian communities.)

As contributing editor on modern Assyrians for the Encyclopædia Iranica, she is responsible for dozens of entries on the Assyrians.

Naby's charitable fund, Naby-Frye Assyrian Fund for Cultural (NFAFC), has been the leading supporter of the Mesopotamian Night programs mounted annually to raise funds for the Assyrian Aid Society. The NFAFC has supported several endeavors to promote the vernacular Aramaic spoken by Assyrians through the publication and dissemination of children's books and videos.

== Select bibliography ==
“Abduction, Rape and Genocide: Urmia’s Assyrian girls and women,” in Hannibal Travis, ed. The Assyrian Genocide: Cultural and Political Legacies (New York, Routledge, 2018) pp. 158–177.

"The Assyrians and Aramaic: Speaking the Oldest Living Language of the Middle East “ http://catedra-unesco.espais.iec.cat (8 March 2016)

- "Theater, Language and Inter-Ethnic Exchange: Assyrian Performance before World War I." Iranian Studies, Volume 40, Issue 4 September 2007, pages 501 - 51
- "The First Kurdish Periodical in Iran", International Journal of Kurdish Studies Vol. 20, nos. 1&2 (2006) pp. 215–233
- "Ishtar: Documenting the Crisis in the Assyrian Iranian Community", Middle East Review of International Affairs, Vol. 10, no. 4, (December 2006), pp 92–102
- "Honey and Vinegar: Attitudes toward Iran's Assyrian Christians". 2006.
- "The Assyrian Diaspora: Cultural Survival in the Absence of State Structure," in S. Mehendale and T. Atabegi, Eds. Central Asia and the Caucasus: Transnationalism and Diaspora (Routledge, Keegan, Paul, 2005) pp. 214–230.
- Introduction The Well of Ararat by Emmanuel Varandyan. Belmont, Massachusetts: Armenian Heritage Press/National Association for Armenian Studies and Research, c2005
- "Almost Family: Assyrians and Armenians in Massachusetts," Armenians of New England: celebrating a culture and preserving a heritage ed. Marc A. Mamigonian. (Belmont, Massachusetts: Armenian Heritage Press, 2004), p. 43-52.

== Selected book titles ==
- (with Michael E. Hopper) The Assyrian experience: sources for the study of the 19th and 20th centuries: from the holdings of the Harvard University Libraries (with a selected bibliography). Cambridge, Massachusetts: Harvard College Library, 1999.
- (with Ralph Magnus) Afghanistan: mullah, Marx, and mujahid. Boulder, Colo: Westview Press, 1998, rpt. 2002.
