= Tell Nasri =

Tell Nasri تل نصري Waltoo
- Village
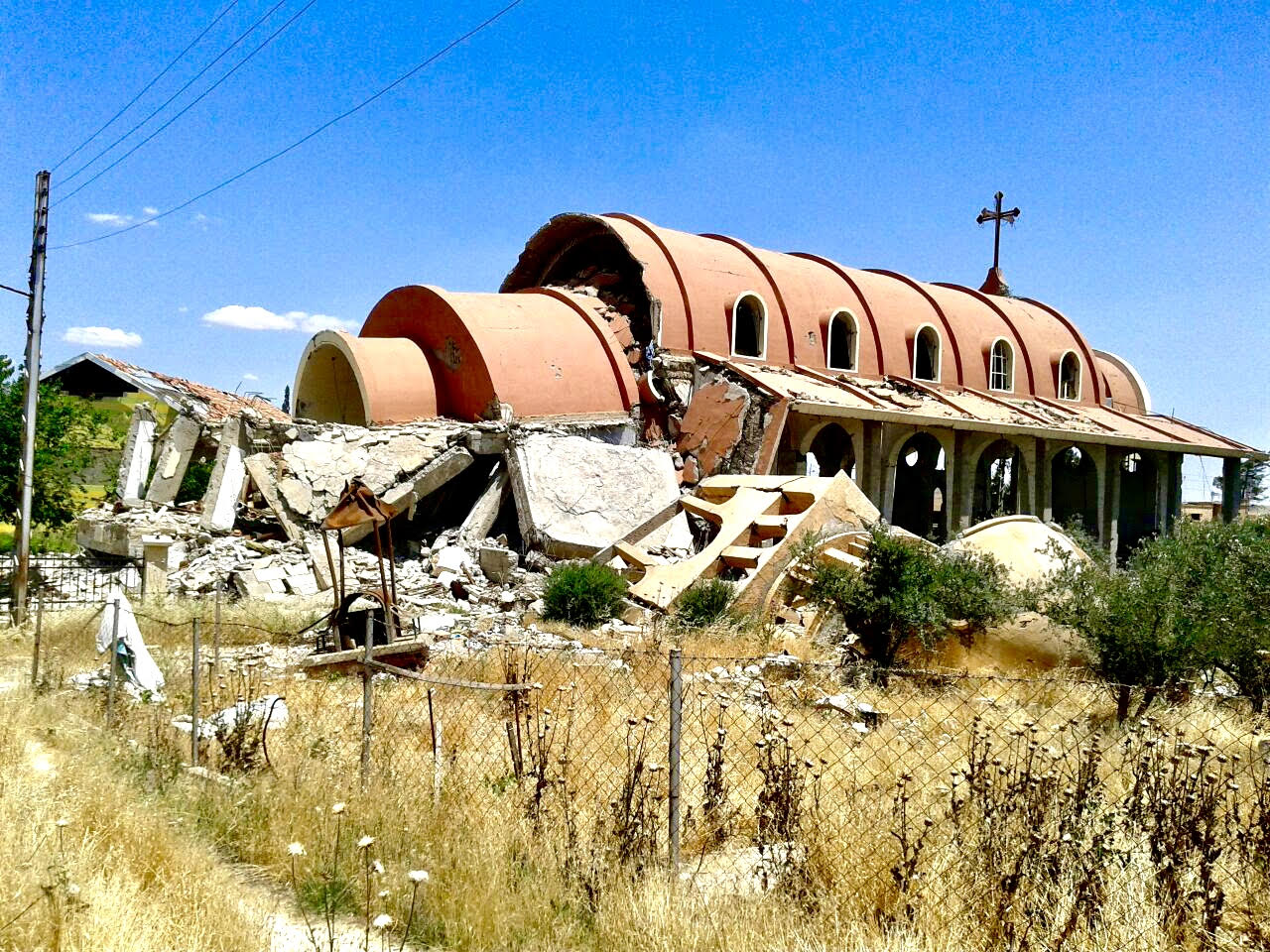
- Church of St. Mary, August 2024

- Location of Tell Nasri in Syria
- Coordinates: 36°38′23″N 40°22′5″E
- Country: Syria
- Governorate: al-Hasakah
- District: al-Hasakah
- Subdistrict: Tell Tamer

Population (2004)
  - Total: 850
- Time zone: UTC+3 (AST)
- Geocode: C4393

Tell Nasri (Arabic: تل نصري), also known as Waltoo ولطو), is a village near Tell Tamer in western al-Hasakah Governorate, northeastern Syria. Administratively it belongs to the Nahiya Tell Tamer.

The village is inhabited by Assyrians belonging to the Assyrian Church of the East. At the 2004 census, it had a population of 650. The people of Waltoo originate from the Hakkari mountains in Turkey. There are 4 different tribes in Waltoo. Resht D Nara, Nashet D Matha, Khidnaya, and Serta. While these four tribes live in the same town now, back in Hakkari they lived in separate villages in a greater area called The Waltoo Valley. The Waltoo valley was a part of Upper Tyari.

In recent years, during the Syrian Civil War, the Assyrian Church of St. Mary had been destroyed by ISIS in April 2015. Before that, on 23rd February 2015, Tell Nasri had been attacked by ISIS and its people fled to both Al-Hasaka and Qamishli seeking refuge.

== Diaspora ==
The Syrian Civil War, which began in 2011, led to the near-total displacement of the population of Tell Nasri (Waltoo), creating a significant global diaspora. While the village's population was recorded at 850 residents in the 2004 census, the ensuing conflict and especially the 2015 ISIS attacks resulted in a mass exodus, leaving only a fraction of the original inhabitants in the village or the surrounding Khabur region. This rapid decline in population mirrors the broader humanitarian crisis and displacement experienced by the Assyrian community in northeastern Syria.

=== The 2015 Exodus and Initial Flight ===
The primary event triggering the mass permanent flight from Waltoo occurred in early 2015. On February 23, 2015, ISIS launched a coordinated offensive on the Assyrian villages along the Khabur River, including Tell Nasri. The inhabitants were forced to flee for their lives, taking refuge primarily in the larger, more secure cities of Al-Hasakah and Qamishli. Although some villagers initially returned after the threat subsided, the destruction of infrastructure—most notably the intentional demolition of the historic Church of St. Mary by ISIS in April 2015—shattered the community's sense of permanence and led most families to seek immediate asylum outside of Syria.

=== Major Global Communities ===
Due to pre-existing Assyrian community networks and established migration pathways, the vast majority of Waltoo families sought refuge in Western countries. The diaspora population now significantly outnumbers the current population within the village, making it an essential demographic factor for the community. The size of the diaspora, measured by family units, is notable across several countries:

- Australia became the single largest destination for families from Waltoo. Over 200 families from the village now reside in Australia.
  - This community is heavily concentrated in Greater Sydney, with more than 85% of the Australian Waltoo population settling there, largely integrating into the established, expansive Assyrian community in Sydney's western suburbs, such as Fairfield City.
- Germany holds the second-largest concentration, with more than 80 families from Waltoo establishing new lives there. Like other Assyrian refugees, this population primarily settled in areas with established Syriac-speaking communities.
- The United States is home to another large segment, counting over 50 families from Waltoo. These families joined the substantial Assyrian diaspora in the US, often settling in key centers of the community.

=== Secondary and Residual Communities ===
In addition to the primary destinations, a significant number of families settled in other Western countries:

- Canada and Sweden host a notable portion of the remaining diaspora. These countries have long been major hosts for Assyrian refugees from the Middle East, offering a welcoming environment for the displaced Waltoo families to rebuild their lives.
- A smaller number of families are scattered across various other European countries.
- Crucially, Lebanon, which historically served as an initial staging point for Assyrians fleeing persecution in the 20th century, continues to host a small, but residual number of families from Waltoo who have yet to move on to permanent resettlement locations.

== Notable People ==
=== Arts and Entertainment ===
Several individuals from the village have become influential figures in modern Assyrian culture, particularly in music and media:

- George Homeh: Widely regarded as one of the greatest artists in modern Assyrian music, his work has been highly impactful across the global Assyrian diaspora.
- John Homeh: A notable creative force, known for his roles as an Assyrian music producer, songwriter, and filmmaker.
- Adam Homeh: Contributed significantly to Assyrian literature and song, recognized for his talent as a poet and songwriter.
- Inanna Sarkis: A well-known figure, particularly recognized for her presence and influence in the digital and entertainment spheres.

=== Community and Religious Service ===
The community has also produced figures who are essential to its social and spiritual well-being:

- Youkhanna Hermez: A prominent Assyrian doctor who established a hospital in the nearby city of Al-Hasakah, providing critical medical services to the region.
- Odisho Odisho: Served as the respected priest for the St. Mary Assyrian Church of the East in Tell Nasri (Waltoo). He held this spiritual leadership role until the community's mass displacement following the 2015 ISIS attacks.

== See also ==
- Assyrians in Syria
- List of Assyrian settlements
- Al-Hasakah offensive (February–March 2015)
