= Gol Pashin =

Gol Pashin گل پاشين
- Village
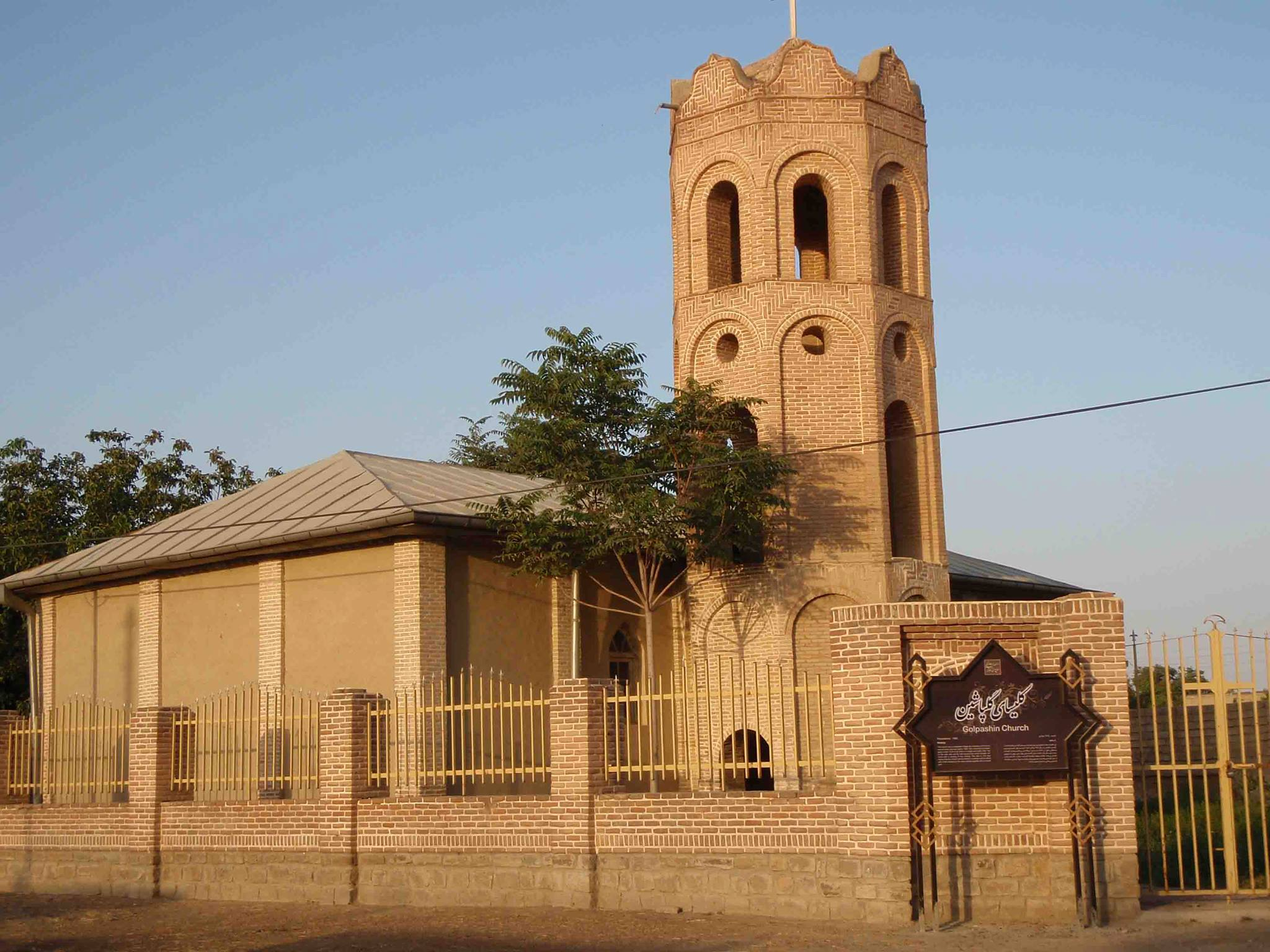
- Assyrian St Givargis Assyrian Church in Gol Pashin

- Location within Iran
- Coordinates: 37°32′33″N 45°10′25″E
- Country: Iran
- Province: West Azerbaijan
- County: Urmia
- Bakhsh: Central
- Rural District: Bakeshluchay

Population (2006)
  - Total: 266
- Time zone: UTC+3:30 (IRST)
  - Summer (DST): UTC+4:30 (IRDT)

Gol Pashin (Persian: گل پاشين, also Romanized as Gol Pāshīn; also known as Gol Parchīn) is a village in Bakeshluchay Rural District, in the Central District of Urmia County, West Azerbaijan Province, Iran. At the 2006 census, its population was 266, in 69 families. Gol Pashin is an Assyrian village and has 1 surviving church, although before it was destroyed in 1918 it had many more, and was a much grander and significant town overall.

For the pre Assyrian genocide history of the town, see Gulpashan.

== See also ==
- Assyrians in Iran
- List of Assyrian settlements
