= Anbi =

Village in West Azerbaijan province, Iran

Anbi Persian: انبي
- Village
- Location within Iran
- Coordinates: 37°30′58″N 44°45′57″E
- Country: Iran
- Province: West Azerbaijan
- County: Urmia
- District: Silvaneh
- Rural District: Targavar

Population (2016)
  - Total: 1,254
- Time zone: UTC+3:30 (IRST)

Anbi (Persian: انبي, romanized: Anbī; Syriac: ʿAnbi) (Note: Also known as Ābnī and Ambi.) is a village in Targavar Rural District of Silvaneh District in Urmia County, West Azerbaijan province, Iran.

== History ==
ʿAnbi was inhabited by 30 Church of the East Christian families with 2 churches in 1877, as per Edward Lewes Cutts. The priest David, son of the deacon Yaʿqōb, of ʿAnbi copied 7 manuscripts at Sīre and 1 manuscript at Ḥaydarlūi between 1881 and 1899. It was located in the Tergāwār district.

== Demographics ==
=== Population ===
At the time of the 2006 National Census, the village's population was 1,066 in 185 households. The following census in 2011 counted 1,302 people in 263 households. The 2016 census measured the population of the village as 1,254 people in 294 households.

== Bibliography ==
- Wilmshurst, David (2000). The Ecclesiastical Organisation of the Church of the East, 1318–1913 (PDF). Peeters Publishers.
