= Susanabad, Urmia =

Susanabad سوسن اباد
- Village
- Location within Iran
- Coordinates: 37°13′52″N 44°52′36″E
- Country: Iran
- Province: West Azerbaijan
- County: Urmia
- Bakhsh: Silvaneh
- Rural District: Margavar

Population (2006)
  - Total: 684
- Time zone: UTC+3:30 (IRST)
  - Summer (DST): UTC+4:30 (IRDT)

Susanabad (Persian: سوسن اباد}, romanized: Sūsanābād; Syriac: Sūsnāwā) is a village in Margavar Rural District, Silvaneh District, Urmia County, West Azerbaijan Province, Iran. At the 2006 census, its population was 684, in 103 families.

== History ==
Sūsnāwā was inhabited by 7 Church of the East Christian families and did not have a church in 1877, as per Edward Lewes Cutts. It was located in the Tergāwār district.

== Bibliography ==
- Wilmshurst, David (2000). The Ecclesiastical Organisation of the Church of the East, 1318–1913 (PDF). Peeters Publishers.
