= Dashqotan =

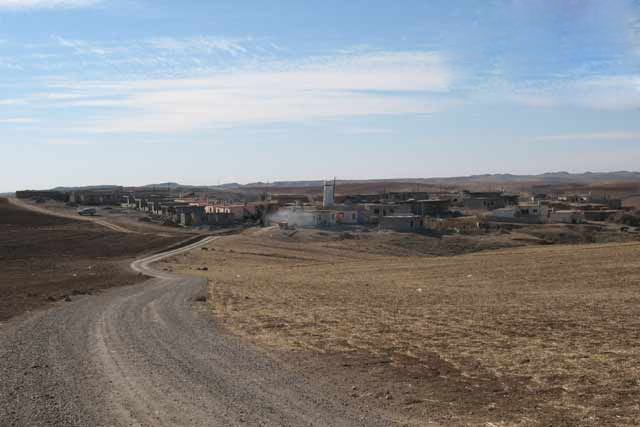

- Location in Iraq
- Coordinates: 36.65696°N 43.21667°E
- Country: Iraq
- Governorate: Nineveh Governorate
- District: Tel Kaif District

Dashqotan (Arabic: دشقوتان) (Note: Alternatively transliterated as Dashkotan, or Deshkotan.) is a village in Nineveh Governorate, Iraq. It is located in the Tel Kaif District in the Nineveh Plains.

In the village, there is a church of the Virgin Mary of the Ancient Church of the East.

== History ==
The Assyrian Aid Society provided a water pump for the village in 2012. The Supreme Committee of Christian Affairs had constructed 33 houses and a church at Dashqotan by 2013. The village's population was forced to flee the Islamic State of Iraq and the Levant offensive in August 2014. In 2015, 15 displaced Christian families inhabited Dashqotan. A power generator was provided to the village by the United States Agency for International Development in October 2019. As of March 2021, the village is inhabited by 112 Assyrians in 25 families.

== Bibliography ==
- Bennett, Byard J. (2016). "Ancient Church of the East". In George Thomas Kurian; Mark A. Lamport (eds.). Encyclopedia of Christianity in the United States. Vol. 5. Rowman & Littlefield. pp. 85–86.
- Rassam, Suha (2005). Christianity in Iraq: Its Origins and Development to the Present Day. Gracewing Publishing.
- Youkhana, Emanuel (2019). "Fleeing ISIS: Aramaic-speaking Christians in the Niniveh Plains after ISIS". In Bayar Mustafa Sevdeen; Thomas Schmidinger (eds.). Beyond ISIS: History and Future of Religious Minorities in Iraq. Transnational Press London. pp. 125–150.
