= Qarah Qiz =

Qarah Qiz قره‌قیز
- Village
- Location within Iran
- Coordinates: 37°44′50″N 45°08′41″E
- Country: Iran
- Province: West Azerbaijan
- County: Urmia
- Bakhsh: Nazlu
- Rural District: Nazlu-e Shomali

Population (2006)
  - Total: 74
- Time zone: UTC+3:30 (IRST)
  - Summer (DST): UTC+4:30 (IRDT)

Qarah Qiz (Persian: قره‌قیز, romanized: Qarah Qīz; Syriac: Qārāqīs) (Note: Also known as Qareh Qīz.) is a village in Nazlu-e Shomali Rural District, Nazlu District, Urmia County, West Azerbaijan Province, Iran. At the 2006 census, its population was 74, in 19 families.

== History ==
The Russian archimandrite Sophoniah listed Qārāqīs with Ikiāghāj in 1862, but did not note its population. At this time, the village was served by the priests Murādḥān, Paul, and Laʿzar of Qārājālū. In 1877, there were 10 Church of the East Christian families with no church or priest at Qārāqīs, as per Edward Lewes Cutts. Basil Nikitin, the Russian consul at Urmia, noted that Qārāqīs was entirely populated by Christians just before the First World War. It was located in the Anzel District.

== Bibliography ==
- Wilmshurst, David (2000). The Ecclesiastical Organisation of the Church of the East, 1318–1913 (PDF). Peeters Publishers.
