= Nahla valley =

Geographic region in Iraq

Nahla Valley ܢܚܠܐ ܕܡܠܟ̈ܐ
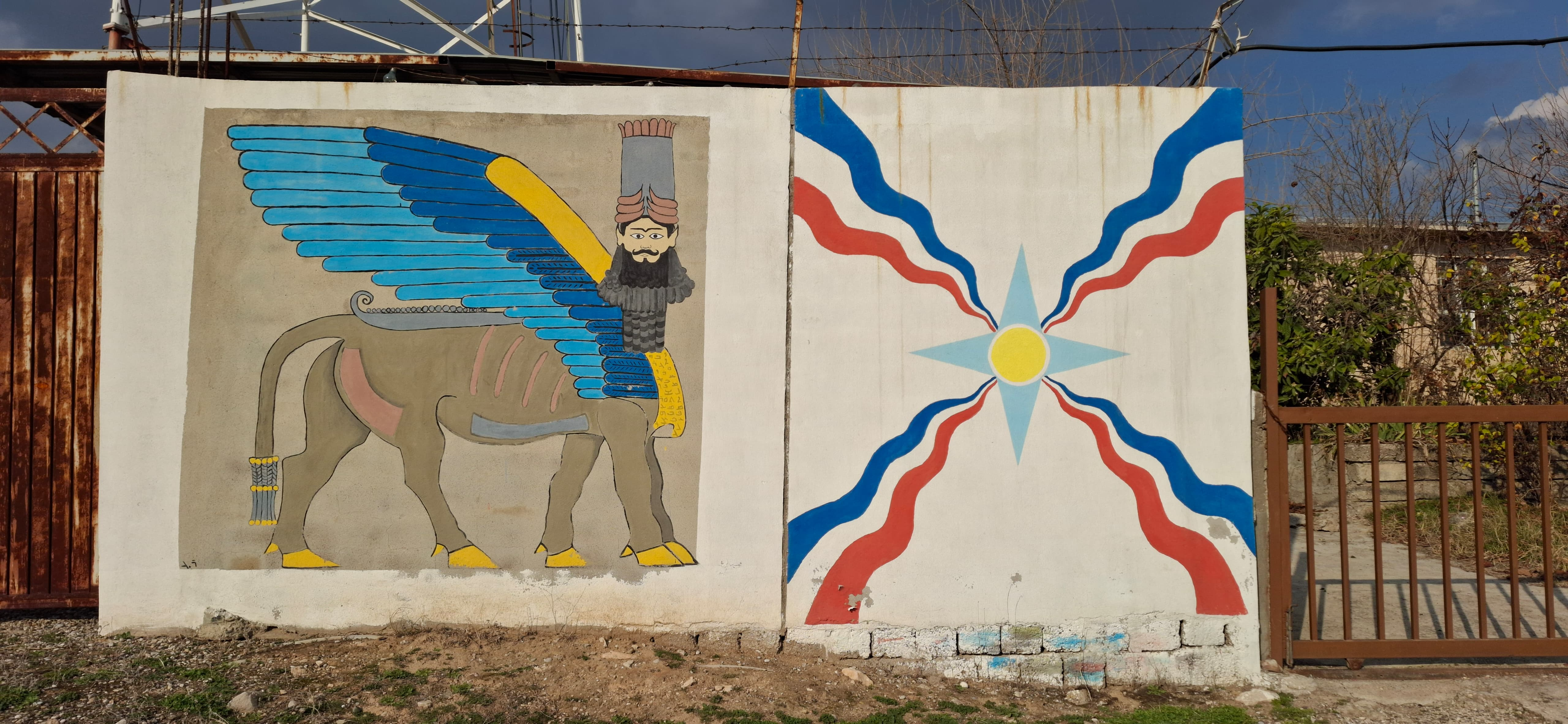
- A wall in the Nahla Valley with Assyrian iconography

Naming
- English translation: Valley of Kings (in Syriac)

Geography
- Location: Akre District, Duhok Governorate, Kurdistan Region, Iraq
- Country: Iraq
- State/Province: Kurdistan Region
- District: Akre District
- Borders on: Sapna valley (northwest), Akre (south), Greater Zab River (north and east), Khazir River (west)
- Coordinates: 36°50′N 43°56′E
- River: Greater Zab River, Khazir River
- Interactive map of Nahla Valley ܢܚܠܐ ܕܡܠܟ̈ܐ

Nahla Valley (Arabic: سهل نهلا, Syriac: ܢܚܠܐ, romanized: naḥlā or Syriac: ܢܚܠܐ ܕܡܠܟ̈ܐ, romanized: naḥlā d-malkē, Kurdish: نه‌هلێ, romanized: Nehlê), meaning “valley of kings” in Syriac, is a geographic region located in the province of Dohuk in the Akre District, Kurdistan Region of Iraq. The Sapna valley lies to the northwest and is separated by a mountain range, and the city of Akre is to the south, separated by another mountain range. It is bound by the Greater Zab River to the north and east, and the Khazir River to the west.

== History ==
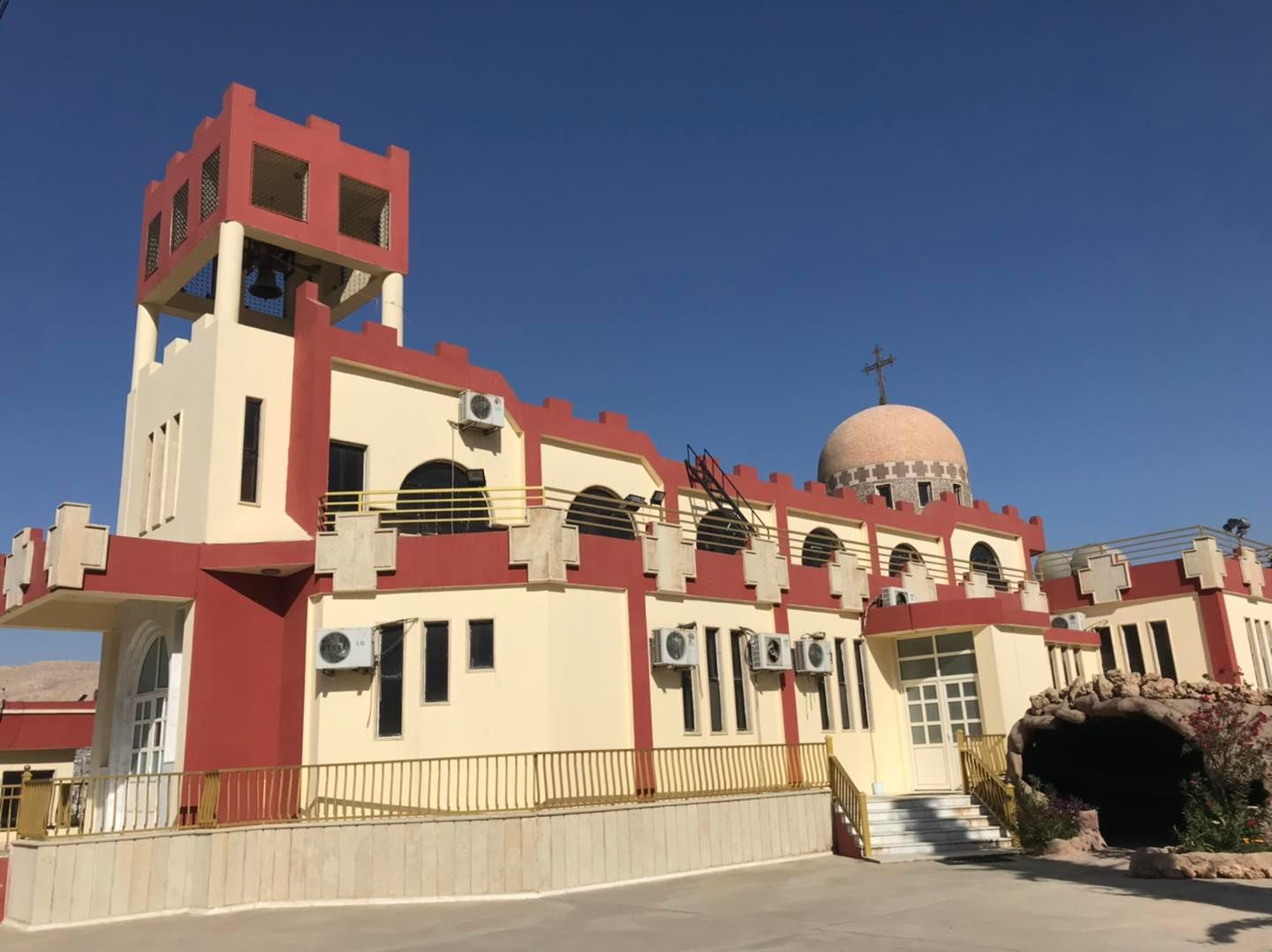
Assyrian Mar Narsai Church in Nohadra

Most of the Assyrians living in Nahla, which number around 20,000, moved there from Hakkari after the Assyrian genocide that occurred during the First World War. However, some villages were emptied in the 1960s when fights between the Iraqi government and Kurdish separatists forced most of their inhabitants to flee to Baghdad and Mosul. Some scarcely populated villages were completely destroyed later on during the Anfal campaign in the 1980s as well. The population of the valley grew considerably following the Iraq War, as many Assyrians living in Dora and Mosul started settling back in the region.

There is significant friction between the Kurds and Assyrians in the valley, with a history of violence, land squatting, and voter suppression since the establishment of Kurdistan Region. On 17 July 1999, the Patriotic Revolutionary Organization of Bet Nahrain claimed that one of its units attacked a KDP Peshmerga position near Kasre in retaliation for the murder of an Assyrian woman. According to an unconfirmed report from the group, the attack killed 39 KDP fighters and wounded 20. In the present day, Kurdish imposed checkpoints in the region pose challenges to the Assyrians living there who intend to enter their villages, including an incident in July 2023 that caused considerable controversy.

In 2023, a Turkish reconnaissance drone crashed in the valley, causing fires to spark that spread across 2km of Assyrian agricultural land. The fires were eventually put out with assistance from the Shlama Foundation. A similar fire had happened two years prior, with Assyrians living in the region unable to put out the fire immediately, nor receive help from the Kurdistan Regional Government.

== See also ==
- Duhok
- Barwari
- Hakkari
- Sapna Valley
- List of Assyrian settlements
