= Bakhetme =

- Village
- Location in Iraq Bakhetme (Iraqi Kurdistan)
- Coordinates: 36°48′25″N 42°51′32″E
- Country: Iraq
- Region: Kurdistan Region
- Governorate: Dohuk Governorate
- District: Simele District
- Sub-district: Fayda

Bakhetme (Arabic: باختمه, Kurdish: باختمێ, Syriac: ܒܚܬܡܐ) (Note: Alternatively transliterated as Bakhtmy, Bakhitme, or Bakhitmey.) is a village in the Dohuk Governorate in the Kurdistan Region, Iraq. It is located in the Simele District.

In the village, there are churches of Mar Gewargis. There was previously churches of Mar Daniel and Mart Maryam.

== Etymology ==
The name of the village is derived from "beth" ("place" in Syriac) and "khatme" ("seals" in Syriac), and thus Bakhetme translates to "the place of the seals".

== History ==
According to local tradition, Bakhetme is the site of the martyrdom of Saint Daniel the Physician, and the monastery of Mar Daniel is believed to have been constructed in the 3rd century AD. Under the Ottoman Empire, Bakhetme served as an administrative centre, from which the village takes its name as a place at which documents or deals were signed and sealed. Bakhetme was settled in 1920 by Assyrian refugees of the Nochiya clan from Hakkari in the aftermath of the Assyrian genocide in Turkey. However, they fled to Syria in 1933 after the Simele massacre.

In 1956, 80 Assyrian families returned to Bakhetme and the village was purchased for 160,000 dinars from Arab sheikhs in the following year, by which time 234 people inhabited Bakhetme, according to the census. A school was established in 1959 and the church of Mart Maryam was constructed in 1960, prior to which services were held in private residences. A church of Mar Gewargis was also built in 1961. In 1978, the village's population was forcibly expelled by the Iraqi government ostensibly due to its proximity to the military base at Fayda.

Bakhetme's population returned soon after and a church of Mar Daniel was built in 1980 and later restored in 1984. The village was completely destroyed by the Iraqi government in April 1987 and its population of 140 Assyrian families was forcibly relocated to Mansouriya near Simele as part of its Arabisation campaign. A number of villagers returned again after the 1991 uprisings and Bakhetme was rebuilt in the following decade as houses were built by the Assyrian Aid Society in 1995 and the church of Mar Gewargis was rebuilt in 1996. The Assyrian Aid Society also built a public hall in 1999.

More of the village's original inhabitants returned to Bakhetme in 2006 and subsequently 151 houses were built by the Kurdistan Regional Government. A second church of Mar Gewargis was built by Sarkis Aghajan Mamendo and was consecrated in April 2007. In early 2009, 248 displaced Assyrians with 62 families resided at Bakhetme. It was estimated that 1200 Assyrians inhabited Bakhetme in 2012, consisting of 700 adherents of the Assyrian Church of the East and 500 Syriac Catholics. Following the Islamic State of Iraq and the Levant offensive in August 2014, the Assyrian Aid Society delivered humanitarian aid to displaced families at Bakhetme in May 2015, in which year it was reported that 88 displaced Assyrian families resided at Bakhetme. The Assyrian Aid Society also renovated the village's school in 2017. The village's population had dropped to 475 people by November 2017, and over 100 families inhabit Bakhetme as of August 2018.

== Bibliography ==
- Donabed, Sargon George (2015). Reforging a Forgotten History: Iraq and the Assyrians in the Twentieth Century. Edinburgh University Press.
- Eshoo, Majed (2004). The Fate Of Assyrian Villages Annexed To Today's Dohuk Governorate In Iraq And The Conditions In These Villages Following The Establishment Of The Iraqi State In 1921 (PDF). Translated by Mary Challita.
- KRSO (2009), "2009 - ناوی پاریزگا. يه که کارگيرييه كانی پاریزگاكانی هه ریمی کوردستان" (PDF), Kurdistan Region Statistics Office (KRSO) (in Kurdish), pp. 1–179
