= Kuraneh, Silvaneh =

Village in West Azerbaijan province, Iran

Kuraneh Persian: كورانه
- Village
- Location within Iran
- Coordinates: 37°34′52″N 44°47′28″E
- Country: Iran
- Province: West Azerbaijan
- County: Urmia
- District: Silvaneh
- Rural District: Targavar

Population (2016)
  - Total: 534
- Time zone: UTC+3:30 (IRST)

Kuraneh (Persian: كورانه) (Note: Also romanized as Kūrāneh) is a village in Targavar Rural District of Silvaneh District in Urmia County, West Azerbaijan province, Iran.

== Demographics ==
=== Population ===
At the time of the 2006 National Census, the village's population was 550 in 99 households. The following census in 2011 counted 525 people in 121 households. The 2016 census measured the population of the village as 534 people in 133 households.
