= Mavana =

Village in West Azerbaijan province, Iran

Mavana Persian: موانا
- Village
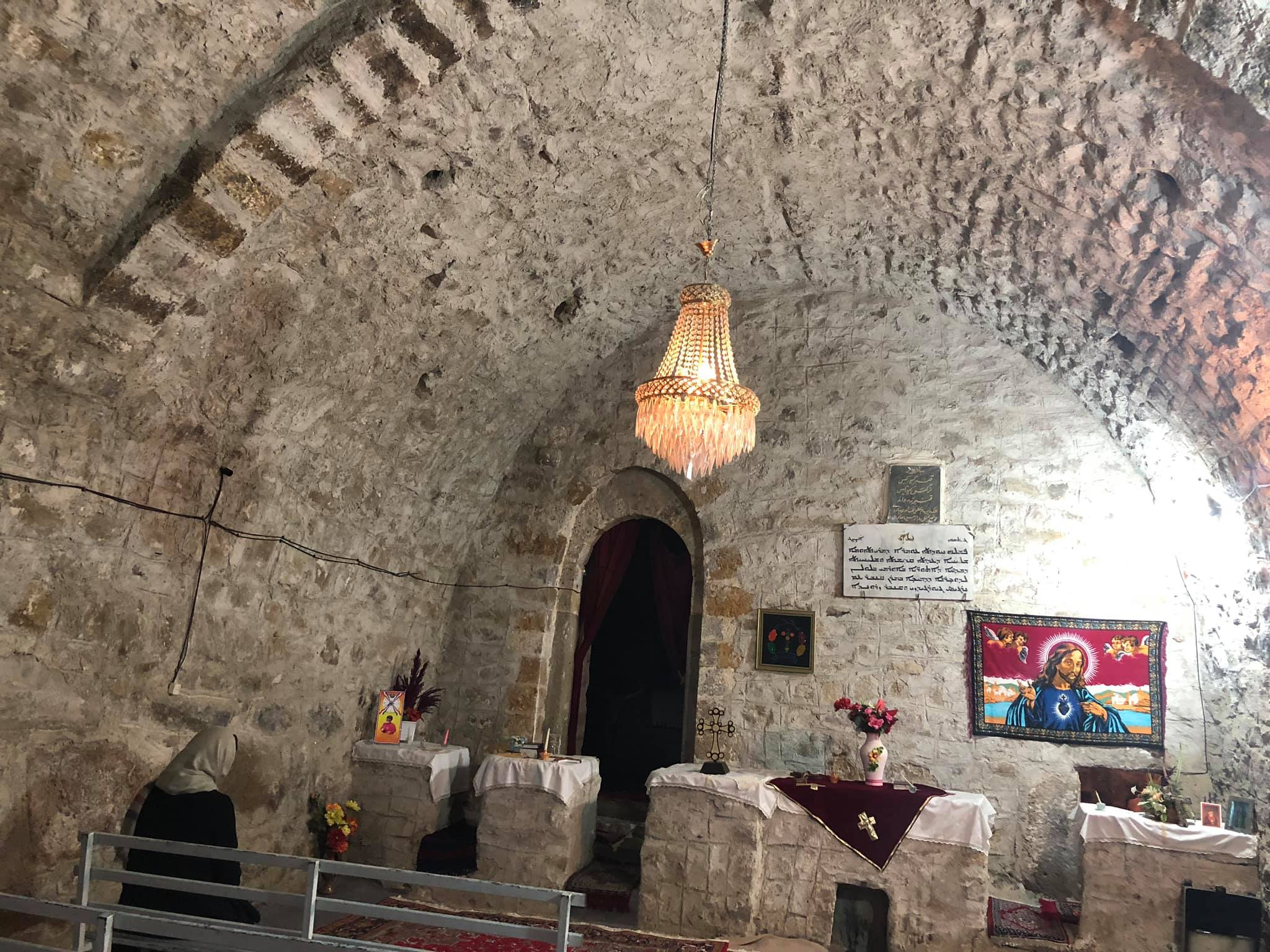
- Assyrian church of Mar Toma in Mavana

- Location within Iran
- Coordinates: 37°34′26″N 44°47′43″E
- Country: Iran
- Province: West Azerbaijan
- County: Urmia
- District: Silvaneh
- Rural District: Targavar

Population (2016)
  - Total: 1,314
- Time zone: UTC+3:30 (IRST)

Mavana (Persian: موانا) (Note: Also romanized as Mavānā, Mawāna, and Movānā; also known as Mavāneh; Syriac ܡܵܘܵܢܵܐ) is a village in, and the capital of, Targavar Rural District in Silvaneh District of Urmia County, West Azerbaijan province, Iran.

== Demographics ==
=== Language and ethnicity ===
While historically Assyrian, the village is populated by Herki Kurds today.

=== Population ===
At the time of the 2006 National Census, the village's population was 1,134 in 179 households. The following census in 2011 counted 1,114 people in 219 households. The 2016 census measured the population of the village as 1,314 people in 275 households. It was the most populous village in its rural district.

== Etymology ==
The name Mavana, which in Syriac is pronounced Ma-wa-na, comes from the words "Em-ma Wane" (ܐܸܡܵܐ ܥܘܵܢܹ̈ܐ) meaning "100 ewes/sheep". The meaning of the village name could point to Mavana being originally settled by sheep herders.

== Gallery ==
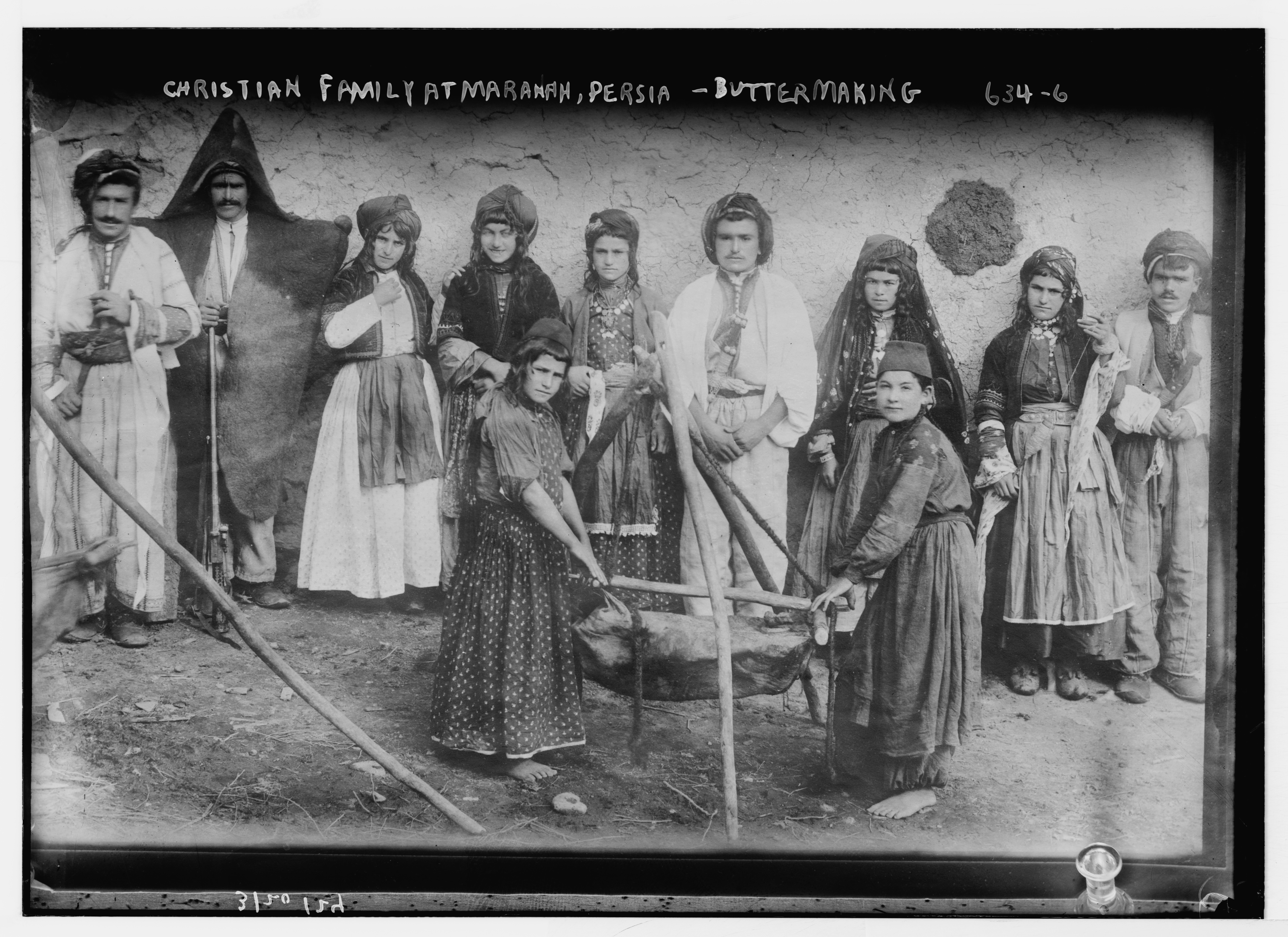
A Mawana Assyrian family making dairy product using sheepskin.

== See also ==
- Assyrians in Iran
- List of Assyrian settlements
