= Towlaki =

Village in West Azerbaijan province, Iran

Towlaki Persian: تولكي
- Village
- Location within Iran
- Coordinates: 37°31′20″N 44°47′55″E
- Country: Iran
- Province: West Azerbaijan
- County: Urmia
- District: Silvaneh
- Rural District: Targavar

Population (2016)
  - Total: 316
- Time zone: UTC+3:30 (IRST)

Towlaki (Persian: تولكي) (Note: Also romanized as Towlakī) is a village in Targavar Rural District of Silvaneh District in Urmia County, West Azerbaijan province, Iran.

== Demographics ==
=== Population ===
At the time of the 2006 National Census, the village's population was 291 in 51 households. The following census in 2011 counted 279 people in 55 households. The 2016 census measured the population of the village as 316 people in 71 households.
