= Tkhuma =

Assyrian Tribe

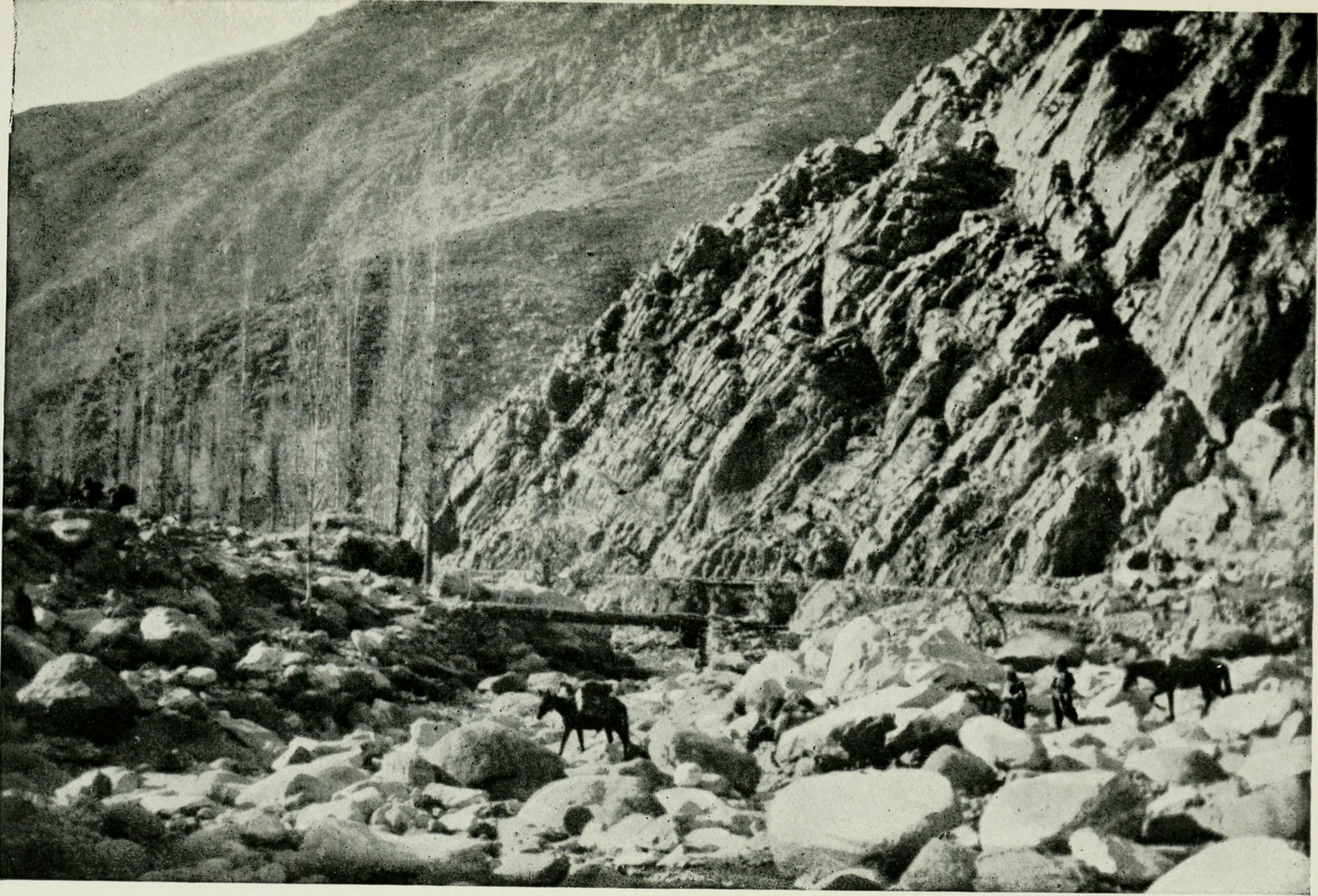
Lower Tkhuma

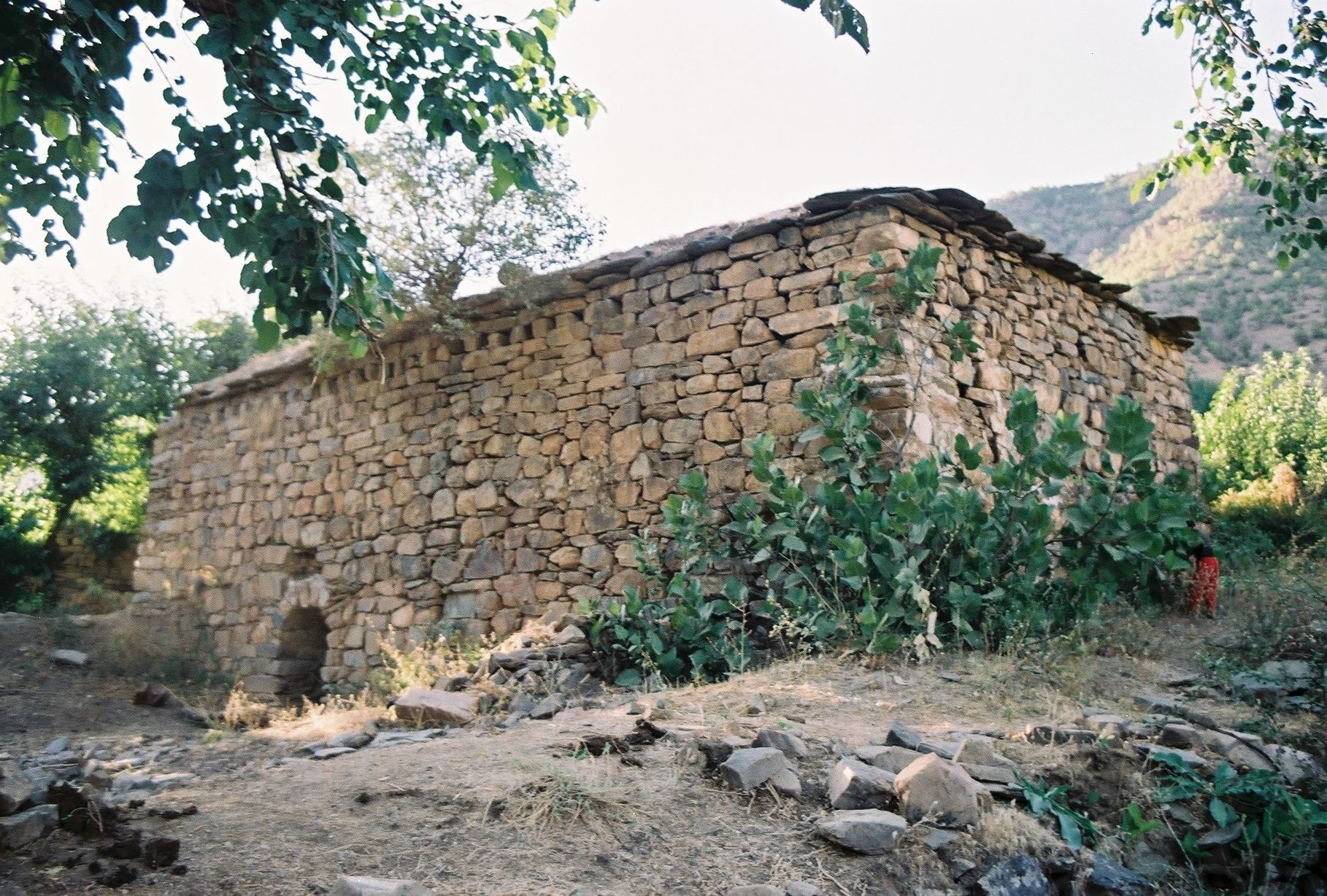
Assyrian church of Saint Artemius (Shalliṭā) in Gawaya, Tkhuma

Prior to World War I, the Tkhuma (Syriac: ܬܚܘܡܐ, romanized: Tkhūmā "Borderland") were one of five principal and semi-independent Assyrian tribes subject to the spiritual and temporal jurisdiction of the Assyrian Patriarch with the title Mar Shimun. The Assyrians claimed the status of a firman of protection from the Caliphate and of an Ottoman millet to preserve their customs and traditions along with the tribes of Jelu, Baz, Tyari, and Deez/Diz, "forming the highest authority under His Holiness Mar Shimun, the patriarch." The Tkhuma Tribe is a tribe of Assyrians that lived in upper Mesopotamia until 1915, when they were dispersed into Persia, Iraq, and Syria during the Sayfo or Assyrian genocide. In 1915, the representative of the Assyrian Patriarch Shimun XX Paulos wrote that the Tkhuma of "many Christian villages" had "been entirely destroyed."

In 1933, Malik Loco Badawi, the chief of the Tkhuma tribe, from the Royal House of Badawi, went with the chief of the Tyari and 700 armed Assyrians into Syria at the outset of the Simele massacre. The League of Nations took responsibility for the resettlement of the Tkhuma Assyrians, reporting in 1937 that 2,350 Tkhuma had been settled in three villages in Syria.

Tkhuma villages in Khabour
Village	Population in 1994
Lower Tell Ruman (Mazra'a)	108
Al-Kharitah (Gissa)	254
Tel Shameh (Gundiktha)	213
Tell Wardiyat (Mazra'a)	108
Al-Makhada (Berija)	286
Tel-Taal (Tal)	468
Tell Sakra (Gundiktha)	564
Tel-Breij (Chal)	179
Tel-Arboush (Arbush)	399
Tell Hormiz (Tkhuma Gawaya)	921
Total:	3,500

== Villages ==
The following villages in Hakkari fell under the control of the Tkhuma Tribe:

- Tkhuma Gawaya
- Gundiktha
- Mazra'a
- Berija
- Gissa

Districts or villages outside of the Tkhuma Valley but fell under the jurisdiction of Tkhuma include:

- Tal
- Chal
- Arbush

== Military ==
It was said that they the Tkhuma Tribe were the best fighters in the West Asia along with the Assyrian tribe of Tyari. Their Muslim neighbors stated that in order to stand a chance they needed to outnumber the Assyrians of Tkhuma or Tyari five to one, and have superior modern weapons.

A journalist of the Ottoman Empire wrote, "The people of Tkhuma put up a great defense on September 27th and 28th [1915]. But while they were building trenches for themselves the Kurds were destroying them with guns. The Turks destroyed... Inner Tkhuma and many other places.".

In 1846, a battle went on in the Tikhoma region between the Assyrian Tikhoma tribe and the Kurdish forces of Bedr Khan Beg. After escaping the destruction of 1843, the Tikhoma Assyrians were attacked again when Bedr Khan led a force from Botan into their territory. Fighting took place for two days at the Srita Spring. Despite their resistance, the Assyrians were unable to withstand the Kurdish force, which numbered in the thousands. Eventually, the Tikhoma tribe retreated and sought refuge in the village of Tal.

In the early 1930s the Assyrians consisting mainly of Tkhoumnayeh and Tyarayeh successfully defeated the Iraqis in Dairabun killing 33 and wounding 40 including 3 officers while the Assyrians suffered significantly less losses. The Iraqis were armed with modern weapons and attack planes given to them by the British while the Assyrians were only equipped with old rifles.
