= Tell Arboush =

Tell Arboush تل عربوش Arboush
- Village
- Location of Tell Arboush in Syria
- Coordinates: 36°34′36″N 40°33′7″E
- Country: Syria
- Governorate: al-Hasakah
- District: al-Hasakah
- Subdistrict: Tell Tamer

Population (2004)
  - Total: 229
- Time zone: UTC+3 (AST)
- Geocode: C4420

Tell Arboush (Arabic: تل عربوش), also known as Arboush (اربوش), is a village near Tell Tamer in western al-Hasakah Governorate, northeastern Syria. Administratively it belongs to the Nahiya Tell Tamer.

The village is inhabited by Assyrians belonging to the Chaldean Catholic Church. At the 2004 census, it had a population of 229.

== See also ==
- Assyrians in Syria
- List of Assyrian settlements
- Al-Hasakah offensive (February–March 2015)
