= Tell Kifji =

Tell Kifji تل كيفجي Liwan
- Village
- Location of Tell Kifji in Syria
- Coordinates: 36°40′11″N 40°20′7″E
- Country: Syria
- Governorate: al-Hasakah
- District: al-Hasakah
- Subdistrict: Tell Tamer

Population (2004)
  - Total: 181
- Time zone: UTC+3 (AST)
- Geocode: C4412

Tell Kifji (Arabic: تل كيفجي), also known as Liwan (ليون), is a village near Tell Tamer in western al-Hasakah Governorate, northeastern Syria. Administratively it belongs to the Nahiya Tell Tamer.

The village is inhabited by Assyrians belonging to the Assyrian Church of the East. At the 2004 census, it had a population of 181.

== See also ==
- Assyrians in Syria
- List of Assyrian settlements
- Al-Hasakah offensive (February–March 2015)
