= Umm al-Keif =

Umm al-Keif أم الكيف Timar
- Village
- Location of Umm al-Keif in Syria
- Coordinates: 36°40′33″N 40°19′14″E
- Country: Syria
- Governorate: al-Hasakah
- District: al-Hasakah
- Subdistrict: Tell Tamer

Population (2004)
  - Total: 1,072
- Time zone: UTC+3 (AST)
- Geocode: C4398

Umm al-Keif (Arabic: أم الكيف), also known as Timar (تيمر), is a village near Tell Tamer in western al-Hasakah Governorate, northeastern Syria. Administratively it belongs to the Nahiya Tell Tamer.

The village is inhabited by Assyrians belonging to the Assyrian Church of the East, and Arabs. At the 2004 census, it had a population of 1,072.

== See also ==
- Assyrians in Syria
- List of Assyrian settlements
- Al-Hasakah offensive (February–March 2015)
