= Tell Talaah =

Tell Talaah تل طلعة Sara
- Village
- Location of Tell Talaah in Syria
- Coordinates: 36°37′13″N 40°22′18″E
- Country: Syria
- Governorate: al-Hasakah
- District: al-Hasakah
- Subdistrict: Tell Tamer

Population (2004)
  - Total: 800
- Time zone: UTC+3 (AST)
- Geocode: C4408

Tell Talaah (Arabic: تل طلعة), also known as Sara (صرا), is a village near Tell Tamer in western al-Hasakah Governorate, northeastern Syria. Administratively it belongs to the Nahiya Tell Tamer.

The village is inhabited by Assyrians belonging to the Assyrian Church of the East. At the 2004 census, it had a population of 800.

== See also ==
- Assyrians in Syria
- List of Assyrian settlements
- Al-Hasakah offensive (February–March 2015)
