= Tell Fuweidat Jazira =

Tell Fuweidat Jazira تل فويضات جزيرة Nochiya
- Village
- Location of Tell Fuweidat Jazira in Syria
- Coordinates: 36°35′37″N 40°25′22″E
- Country: Syria
- Governorate: al-Hasakah
- District: al-Hasakah
- Subdistrict: Tell Tamer

Population (2004)
  - Total: 439
- Time zone: UTC+3 (AST)
- Geocode: n/a

Tell Fuweidat Jazira (Arabic: تل فويضات جزيرة), also known as Nochiya (نوجيا), is a village near Tell Tamer in western al-Hasakah Governorate, northeastern Syria. Administratively it belongs to the Nahiya Tell Tamer.

The village is inhabited by Assyrians belonging to the Assyrian Church of the East. At the 2004 census, it had a population of 439.

== See also ==
- Assyrians in Syria
- List of Assyrian settlements
- Al-Hasakah offensive (February–March 2015)
