= Tell Hefyan =

Tell Hefyan تل حفيان Qodchanis
- Village
- Location of Tell Hefyan in Syria
- Coordinates: 36°38′10″N 40°23′12″E
- Country: Syria
- Governorate: al-Hasakah
- District: al-Hasakah
- Subdistrict: Tell Tamer

Population (2004)
  - Total: 1,132
- Time zone: UTC+3 (AST)
- Geocode: C4427

Tell Hefyan (Arabic: تل حفيان), also known as Qodchanis (قوجانس), is a village near Tell Tamer in western al-Hasakah Governorate, northeastern Syria. Administratively it belongs to the Nahiya Tell Tamer.

The village is inhabited by Assyrians belonging to the Assyrian Church of the East, and Arabs. At the 2004 census, it had a population of 1,132.

== Recent History ==
Most of the Assyrian inhabitants of the village were displaced when ISIS attacked the area in February 2015.

== See also ==
- List of Assyrian settlements
- Al-Hasakah offensive (February–March 2015)
