= Tell Bureij =

Tell Bureij تل بريج Chal
- Village
- Location of Tell Bureij in Syria
- Coordinates: 36°34′12″N 40°32′38″E
- Country: Syria
- Governorate: al-Hasakah
- District: al-Hasakah
- Subdistrict: Tell Tamer

Population (2004)
  - Total: 109
- Time zone: UTC+3 (AST)
- Geocode: n/a

Tell Bureij (Arabic: تل بريج), also known as Chal (جال), is a village near Tell Tamer in western al-Hasakah Governorate, northeastern Syria. Administratively it belongs to the Nahiya Tell Tamer.

The village is inhabited by Assyrians belonging to the Assyrian Church of the East. At the 2004 census, it had a population of 109.

== See also ==
- Assyrians in Syria
- List of Assyrian settlements
- Al-Hasakah offensive (February–March 2015)
