= Tell Massas =

Tell Massas تل مساس Barwar
- Village
- Location of Tell Massas in Syria
- Coordinates: 36°36′31″N 40°23′59″E
- Country: Syria
- Governorate: al-Hasakah
- District: al-Hasakah
- Subdistrict: Tell Tamer

Population (2004)
  - Total: 231
- Time zone: UTC+3 (AST)
- Geocode: C4423

Tell Massas (Arabic: تل مساس), also known as Barwar (برور), is a village near Tell Tamer in western al-Hasakah Governorate, northeastern Syria. Administratively it belongs to the Nahiya Tell Tamer.

The village is inhabited by Assyrians belonging to the Assyrian Church of the East. At the 2004 census, it had a population of 231.

== See also ==
- Assyrians in Syria
- List of Assyrian settlements
- Al-Hasakah offensive (February–March 2015)
