= Tell Shamiram =

Tell Shamiram تل شميرام Marbisho
- Village
- Location of Tell Shamiram in Syria
- Coordinates: 36°38′21″N 40°21′26″E
- Country: Syria
- Governorate: al-Hasakah
- District: al-Hasakah
- Subdistrict: Tell Tamer

Population (2004)
  - Total: 811
- Time zone: UTC+3 (AST)
- Geocode: C4430

Tell Shamiram or Tell Shamiran (Arabic: تل شميرام أو تل شميران), also known as Marbisho (ماربيشو), is a village near Tell Tamer in western al-Hasakah Governorate, northeastern Syria. Administratively it belongs to the Nahiya Tell Tamer.

The village is inhabited by Assyrians belonging to the Assyrian Church of the East, and Arabs. At the 2004 census, it had a population of 811.

== Geography ==
It is located on the Khabour River near the confluence with the Zirgan River, about 70 kilometres (43 mi) south of the border with Turkey.

== History ==
The village was settled by Assyrian refugees in 1933 who moved following the Simele massacre to French controlled Syria to settle in a 25 kilometres (16 mi) stretch of the Khabur River in 35 settlements.

In February 2015 the village was taken by the Islamic State militia during the Eastern al-Hasakah offensive, resulting in the abduction of about 90, mainly elderly, residents. Several thousand residents fled the city, mostly to the city of al-Hasakah, with some eventually reaching Lebanon. Unconfirmed reports indicate that the village has been emptied of people by 1 March 2015.

== See also ==
- Assyrians in Syria
- List of Assyrian settlements
