= Tell Balouaah =

Tell Balouaah تل بالوعة Dizen
- Village
- Location of Tell Balouaah in Syria
- Coordinates: 36°34′17″N 40°28′16″E
- Country: Syria
- Governorate: al-Hasakah
- District: al-Hasakah
- Subdistrict: Tell Tamer

Population (2004)
  - Total: 443
- Time zone: UTC+3 (AST)
- Geocode: C4401

Tell Balouaah (Arabic: تل بالوعة), also known as Dizen (ديزن), is a village near Tell Tamer in western al-Hasakah Governorate, northeastern Syria. Administratively it belongs to the Nahiya Tell Tamer.

The village is inhabited by Assyrians belonging to the Assyrian Church of the East. At the 2004 census, it had a population of 443.

== See also ==
- Assyrians in Syria
- List of Assyrian settlements
- Al-Hasakah offensive (February–March 2015)
