= Umm Ghargan =

Umm Ghargan أم غركان Tkhuma
- Village
- Location of Umm Ghargan in Syria
- Coordinates: 36°34′35″N 40°33′31″E
- Country: Syria
- Governorate: al-Hasakah
- District: al-Hasakah
- Subdistrict: Tell Tamer

Population (2004)
  - Total: 275
- Time zone: UTC+3 (AST)
- Geocode: n/a

Umm Ghargan (Arabic: أم غركان), also known as Tkhuma (تخوما), is a village near Tell Tamer in western al-Hasakah Governorate, northeastern Syria. Administratively it belongs to the Nahiya Tell Tamer.

The village is inhabited by Assyrians belonging to the Assyrian Church of the East. At the 2004 census, it had a population of 275.

== See also ==
- Assyrians in Syria
- List of Assyrian settlements
- Al-Hasakah offensive (February–March 2015)
