= Tell Maghas =

Tell Maghas تل مغاص Gawar
- Village
- Location of Tell Maghas in Syria
- Coordinates: 36°36′56″N 40°23′17″E
- Country: Syria
- Governorate: al-Hasakah
- District: al-Hasakah
- Subdistrict: Tell Tamer

Population (2004)
  - Total: 194
- Time zone: UTC+3 (AST)
- Geocode: C4394

Tell Maghas (Arabic: تل مغاص), also known as Gawar (كاور), is a village near Tell Tamer in western al-Hasakah Governorate, northeastern Syria. Administratively it belongs to the Nahiya Tell Tamer.

The village is inhabited by Assyrians belonging to the Assyrian Church of the East. At the 2004 census, it had a population of 194.

== See also ==
- Assyrians in Syria
- List of Assyrian settlements
- Al-Hasakah offensive (February–March 2015)
