= Tell Goran =

Tell Goran تل كوران Jilu
- Village
- Location of Tell Goran in Syria
- Coordinates: 36°35′46″N 40°24′30″E
- Country: Syria
- Governorate: al-Hasakah
- District: al-Hasakah
- Subdistrict: Tell Tamer

Population (2004)
  - Total: 183
- Time zone: UTC+3 (AST)
- Geocode: n/a

Tell Goran (Arabic: تل كوران), also known as Jilu (جيلو), is a village near Tell Tamer in western al-Hasakah Governorate, northeastern Syria. Administratively it belongs to the Nahiya Tell Tamer.

The village is inhabited by Assyrians belonging to the Assyrian Church of the East. At the 2004 census, it had a population of 183.

== See also ==
- Assyrians in Syria
- List of Assyrian settlements
- Al-Hasakah offensive (February–March 2015)
