= Abu Tinah =

Abu Tinah أبو تينة Jilu
- Village
- Location of Abu Tinah in Syria
- Coordinates: 36°36′14″N 40°23′38″E
- Country: Syria
- Governorate: al-Hasakah
- District: al-Hasakah
- Subdistrict: Tell Tamer

Population (2004)
  - Total: 301
- Time zone: UTC+3 (AST)
- Geocode: C4410

Abu Tinah (Arabic: أبو تينة), also known as Jilu (جيلو), is a village near Tell Tamer in western al-Hasakah Governorate, northeastern Syria. Administratively it belongs to the Nahiya Tell Tamer.

The village is inhabited by Assyrians belonging to the Assyrian Church of the East. At the 2004 census, it had a population of 301.

== See also ==
- Assyrians in Syria
- List of Assyrian settlements
- Al-Hasakah offensive (February–March 2015)
