= Qaber Shamiyah =

Village in al-Hasakah, Syria

Qaber Shamiyah قبر شامية Dizen
- Village
- Location of Qaber Shamiyah in Syria
- Coordinates: 36°34′43″N 40°26′50″E
- Country: Syria
- Governorate: al-Hasakah
- District: al-Hasakah
- Subdistrict: Tell Tamer

Population (2004)
  - Total: 734
- Time zone: UTC+3 (AST)
- Geocode: n/a

Qaber Shamiyah (Arabic: قبر شامية), also known as Dizen (ديزن), is a village near Tell Tamer in western al-Hasakah Governorate, northeastern Syria. Administratively it belongs to the Nahiya Tell Tamer.

The village is inhabited by Assyrians belonging to the Assyrian Church of the East, and Arabs. At the 2004 census, it had a population of 734. When the Islamic State group took over, the Saint George church was burned. By the end of 2021, there were only three Assyrian Christians remaining in the village.

== See also ==
- Assyrians in Syria
- List of Assyrian settlements
- Al-Hasakah offensive (February–March 2015)
