= Tell Jemaah =

Tell Jemaah تل جمعة Halmoun
- Village
- Location of Tell Jemaah in Syria
- Coordinates: 36°40′00″N 40°20′33″E
- Country: Syria
- Governorate: al-Hasakah
- District: al-Hasakah
- Subdistrict: Tell Tamer

Population (2004)
  - Total: 1,260
- Time zone: UTC+3 (AST)
- Geocode: C4431

Tell Jemaah (Arabic: تل جمعة), also known as Halmoun (هلمون), is a village near Tell Tamer in western al-Hasakah Governorate, northeastern Syria. Administratively it belongs to the Nahiya Tell Tamer.

The village is inhabited by Assyrians belonging to the Assyrian Church of the East. At the 2004 census, it had a population of 1,260.

== See also ==
- Assyrians in Syria
- List of Assyrian settlements
- Al-Hasakah offensive (February–March 2015)
