= Tell Makhadah =

Tell Makhadah تل مخاضة Berijah
- Village
- Location of Tell Makhadah in Syria
- Coordinates: 36°34′3″N 40°30′23″E
- Country: Syria
- Governorate: al-Hasakah
- District: al-Hasakah
- Subdistrict: Tell Tamer

Population (2004)
  - Total: 72
- Time zone: UTC+3 (AST)
- Geocode: C4425

Tell Makhadah (Arabic: تل مخاضة), also known as Berijah (برجناية), is a village near Tell Tamer in western al-Hasakah Governorate, northeastern Syria. Administratively it belongs to the Nahiya Tell Tamer.

The village is inhabited by Assyrians belonging to the Assyrian Church of the East. At the 2004 census, it had a population of 72.

== See also ==
- Assyrians in Syria
- List of Assyrian settlements
- Al-Hasakah offensive (February–March 2015)
