= Tell Shamah =

Tell Shamah تل شامة Gundikta
- Village
- Location of Tell Shamah in Syria
- Coordinates: 36°34′28″N 40°30′29″E
- Country: Syria
- Governorate: al-Hasakah
- District: al-Hasakah
- Subdistrict: Tell Tamer

Population (2004)
  - Total: 162
- Time zone: UTC+3 (AST)
- Geocode: C4388

Tell Shamah (Arabic: تل شامة), also known as Gundikta (كوندكثا), is a village near Tell Tamer in western al-Hasakah Governorate, northeastern Syria. Administratively it belongs to the Nahiya Tell Tamer.

The village is inhabited by Assyrians belonging to the Assyrian Church of the East. At the 2004 census, it had a population of 162.

== See also ==
- Assyrians in Syria
- List of Assyrian settlements
- Al-Hasakah offensive (February–March 2015)
