= Tell Tawil, al-Hasakah Governorate =

Tell Tawil تل طويل Bnay Roumta
- Village
- Location of Tell Tawil in Syria
- Coordinates: 36°39′48″N 40°17′3″E
- Country: Syria
- Governorate: al-Hasakah
- District: al-Hasakah
- Subdistrict: Tell Tamer

Population (2004)
  - Total: 669
- Time zone: UTC+3 (AST)
- Geocode: C4421

Tell Tawil (Arabic: تل طويل), also known as Bnay Roumta (بني رومتا), is a village near Tell Tamer in western al-Hasakah Governorate, northeastern Syria. Administratively, it belongs to the Nahiya Tell Tamer.

The village is inhabited by Assyrians belonging to the Assyrian Church of the East. At the 2004 census, it had a population of 669. Together with other villages in the Khabur valley, the village was attacked by ISIS in February 2015, which led to the displacement of most of the Assyrian inhabitants.

== See also ==
- Assyrians in Syria
- List of Assyrian settlements
- Al-Hasakah offensive (February–March 2015)
