= Tell Tal =

Tell Tal تل طال Tal
- Village
- Location of Tell Tal in Syria
- Coordinates: 36°34′5″N 40°31′39″E
- Country: Syria
- Governorate: al-Hasakah
- District: al-Hasakah
- Subdistrict: Tell Tamer

Population (2004)
  - Total: 314
- Time zone: UTC+3 (AST)
- Geocode: n/a

Tell Tal (Arabic: تل طال), also known as Tal (طلنايا), is a village near Tell Tamer in western al-Hasakah Governorate, northeastern Syria. Administratively it belongs to the Nahiya Tell Tamer.

The village is inhabited by Assyrians belonging to the Assyrian Church of the East. At the 2004 census, it had a population of 314.

== See also ==
- Assyrians in Syria
- List of Assyrian settlements
- Al-Hasakah offensive (February–March 2015)
