= Tell Damshij =

Tell Damshij تل دمشيج Qodchanis
- Village
- Location of Tell Damshij in Syria
- Coordinates: 36°35′27″N 40°25′59″E
- Country: Syria
- Governorate: al-Hasakah
- District: al-Hasakah
- Subdistrict: Tell Tamer

Population (2004)
  - Total: 153
- Time zone: UTC+3 (AST)
- Geocode: C4397

Tell Damshij (Arabic: تل دمشيج), also known as Qodchanis (قوجانس), is a village near Tell Tamer in western al-Hasakah Governorate, northeastern Syria. Administratively it belongs to the Nahiya Tell Tamer.

The village is inhabited by Assyrians belonging to the Assyrian Church of the East. At the 2004 census, it had a population of 153.

== See also ==
- Assyrians in Syria
- List of Assyrian settlements
- Al-Hasakah offensive (February–March 2015)
