= Tell Hermez =

Tell Hermez تل هرمز Tkhuma
- Village
- Location of Tell Hermez in Syria
- Coordinates: 36°33′53″N 40°33′23″E
- Country: Syria
- Governorate: al-Hasakah
- District: al-Hasakah
- Subdistrict: Tell Tamer

Population (2004)
  - Total: 575
- Time zone: UTC+3 (AST)
- Geocode: C4390

Tell Hermez (Arabic: تل هرمز), also known as Tkhuma (تخوما), is a village near Tell Tamer in western al-Hasakah Governorate, northeastern Syria. Administratively it belongs to the Nahiya Tell Tamer.

The village is inhabited by Assyrians belonging to the Ancient Church of the East. At the 2004 census, it had a population of 575.

== See also ==
- Assyrians in Syria
- List of Assyrian settlements
- Al-Hasakah offensive (February–March 2015)
