= Tell Ruman (Tahtani) =

Tell Ruman Tahtani تل رمان Mazra
- Village
- Location of Tell Ruman Tahtani in Syria
- Coordinates: 36°34′38″N 40°28′46″E
- Country: Syria
- Governorate: al-Hasakah
- District: al-Hasakah
- Subdistrict: Tell Tamer

Population (2004)
  - Total: 354
- Time zone: UTC+3 (AST)
- Geocode: C4422

Tell Ruman Tahtani (Arabic: تل رمان), also known as Mazra (مزرا), is a village near Tell Tamer in western al-Hasakah Governorate, northeastern Syria. Administratively it belongs to the Nahiya Tell Tamer.

The village is inhabited by Assyrians belonging to the Assyrian Church of the East. At the 2004 census, it had a population of 354.

== See also ==
- Assyrians in Syria
- List of Assyrian settlements
- Al-Hasakah offensive (February–March 2015)
