= Tell Baz =

Tell Baz تل باز Baz
- Village
- Location of Tell Baz in Syria
- Coordinates: 36°34′37″N 40°28′10″E
- Country: Syria
- Governorate: al-Hasakah
- District: al-Hasakah
- Subdistrict: Tell Tamer

Population (2004)
  - Total: 251
- Time zone: UTC+3 (AST)
- Geocode: C4404

Tell Baz (Arabic: تل باز), also known as Baz (باز), is a village near Tell Tamer in western al-Hasakah Governorate, northeastern Syria. Administratively it belongs to the Nahiya Tell Tamer.

The village is inhabited by Assyrians belonging to the Assyrian Church of the East. At the 2004 census, it had a population of 251.

== See also ==
- Assyrians in Syria
- List of Assyrian settlements
- Al-Hasakah offensive (February–March 2015)
