= Tell Sakra =

Tell Sakra تل سكرة Gundikta
- Village
- Location of Tell Sakra in Syria
- Coordinates: 36°34′30″N 40°31′52″E
- Country: Syria
- Governorate: al-Hasakah
- District: al-Hasakah
- Subdistrict: Tell Tamer

Population (2004)
  - Total: 307
- Time zone: UTC+3 (AST)
- Geocode: C4392

Tell Sakra (Arabic: تل سكرة), also known as Gundikta (كوندكنايا), is a village near Tell Tamer in western al-Hasakah Governorate, northeastern Syria. Administratively it belongs to the Nahiya Tell Tamer.

The village is inhabited by Assyrians belonging to the Assyrian Church of the East and the Chaldean Catholic Church. At the 2004 census, it had a population of 307.

== See also ==
- Assyrians in Syria
- List of Assyrian settlements
- Al-Hasakah offensive (February–March 2015)
