= Tell Wardiyat =

Tell Wardiyat تل ورديات
- Village
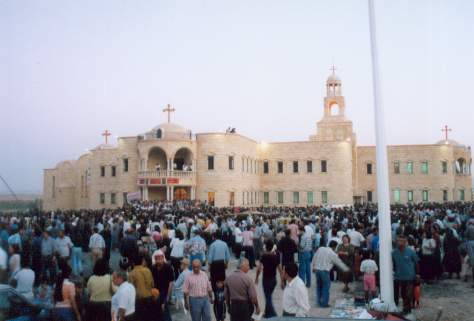
- Syriac Orthodox Monastery of the Virgin Mary in Tell Wardiyat

- Location within Syria
- Coordinates: 36°34′30″N 40°30′53″E
- Country: Syria
- Governorate: al-Hasakah
- District: al-Hasakah
- Subdistricts: Tell Tamer
- Time zone: UTC+3 (AST)

Tell Wardiyat (Arabic: تل ورديات, Syriac: ܬܰܠ ܘܰܪܕܺܝܰܬ), is a village located in al-Hasakah Governorate in northeastern Syria. The village is inhabited by Assyrians belonging to the Assyrian Church of the East and the Syriac Orthodox Church.

== See also ==
- Assyrians in Syria
- List of Assyrian settlements
- Al-Hasakah offensive (February–March 2015)
