= Tell Brak (village) =

Tell Brak تل براك
- Village
- Location of Tell Brak in Syria
- Coordinates: 36°40′47″N 41°03′28″E
- Country: Syria
- Governorate: al-Hasakah
- District: al-Hasakah
- Subdistrict: Bir al-Helou al-Wardiya

Population (2004)
  - Total: 124
- Time zone: UTC+3 (AST)
- Geocode: C4477

Tell Brak (Arabic: تل براك), also spelled Tal Brak, is a village in northern Al-Hasakah Governorate, northeastern Syria. It is the nearest village to the site of historical Tell Brak.

Administratively the village belongs to the Nahiya Bir al-Helou al-Wardiya of al-Hasakah District. At the 2004 census, it had a population of 124.
