= Baz (tribe) =

One of the five independent Assyrian tribes of the Hakkari region

Coordinates: 38°01′N 44°06′E

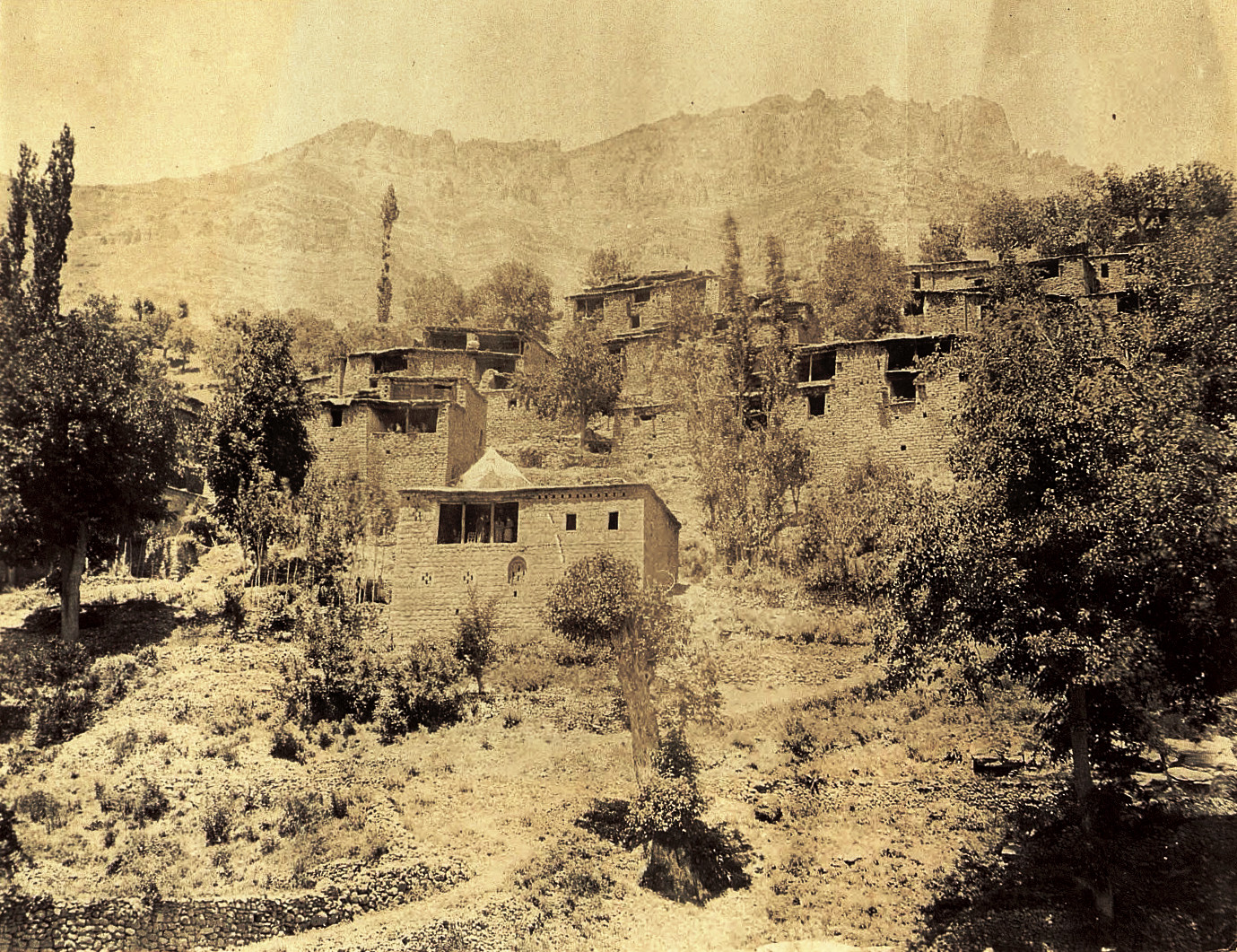
Mata Khtata, a village in Baz, Hakkari, c. 1900

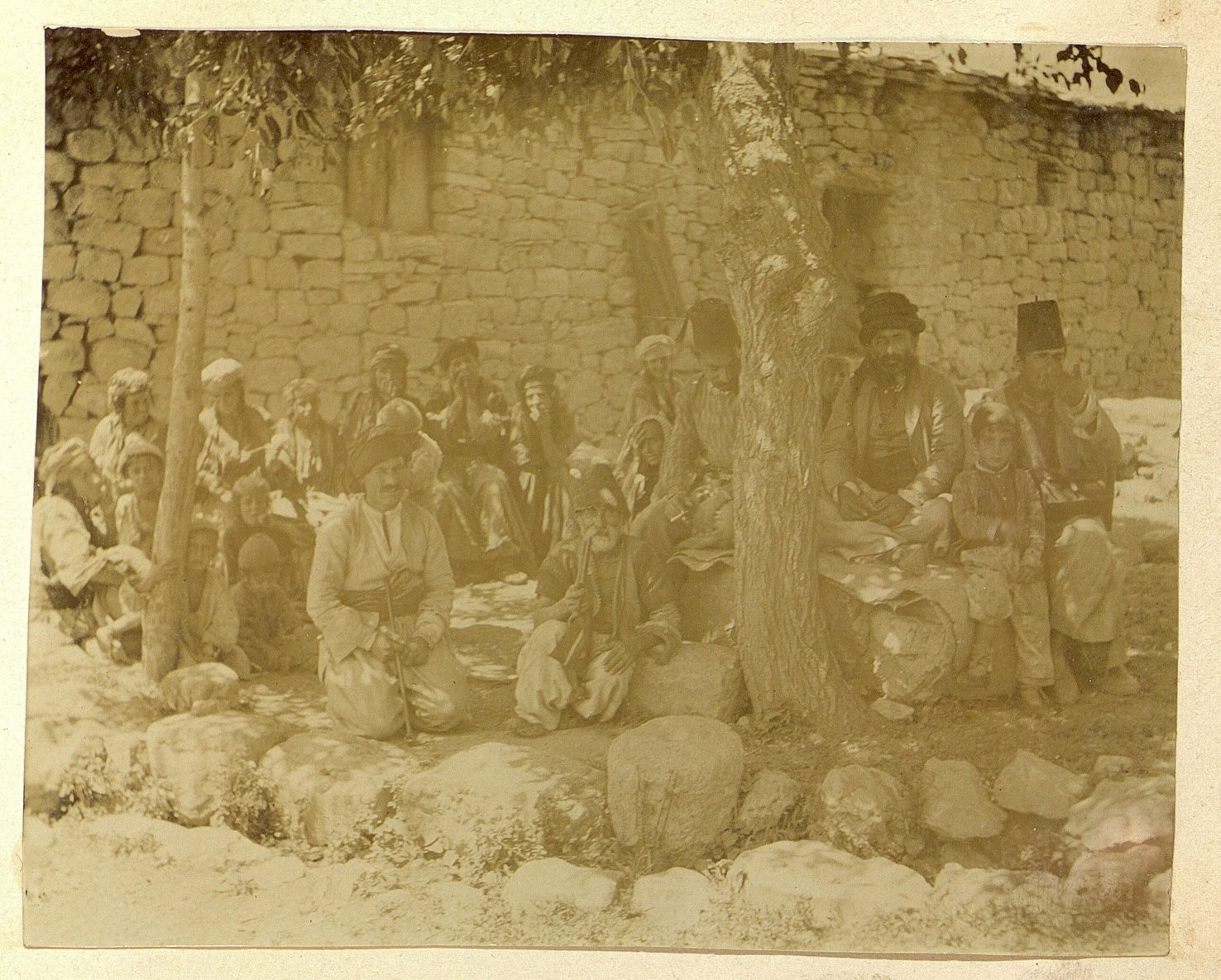
Assyrians under a tree in Baz, Hakkari, c. 1900

Baz (Syriac: ܒܙ) was one of the five independent Assyrian tribes of the Hakkari region, and is present in both Iraq and Syria today.

== History ==
Maha Khtayya was the chief village of the region, followed by Shwawwa.

The Assyrians of the Baz tribe were renowned carpenters and iron-workers who worked not only in their villages, but throughout Mosul and other large towns of Upper Mesopotamia.

== Assyrian Villages in Baz, Turkey ==
The Assyrian settlements that traditionally comprised the Baz region in Hakkari consist of the following villages. The region has been empty since they were abandoned in 1915 due to the Assyrian genocide.

- Arwantus (Artusnaye)
- Shwawwa (Shawutnaye)
- Maha Khtayya (Mahaye) (37°27 N, 43°53 E)
- Be-Selim (Selimnaye)
- Argab (Argabaye)
- Kojij (Kojijnaye)

== Current Baznaye settlements ==
These are the villages occupied after the Baznaye were resettled by the British in 1920s and the French in the 1930s.

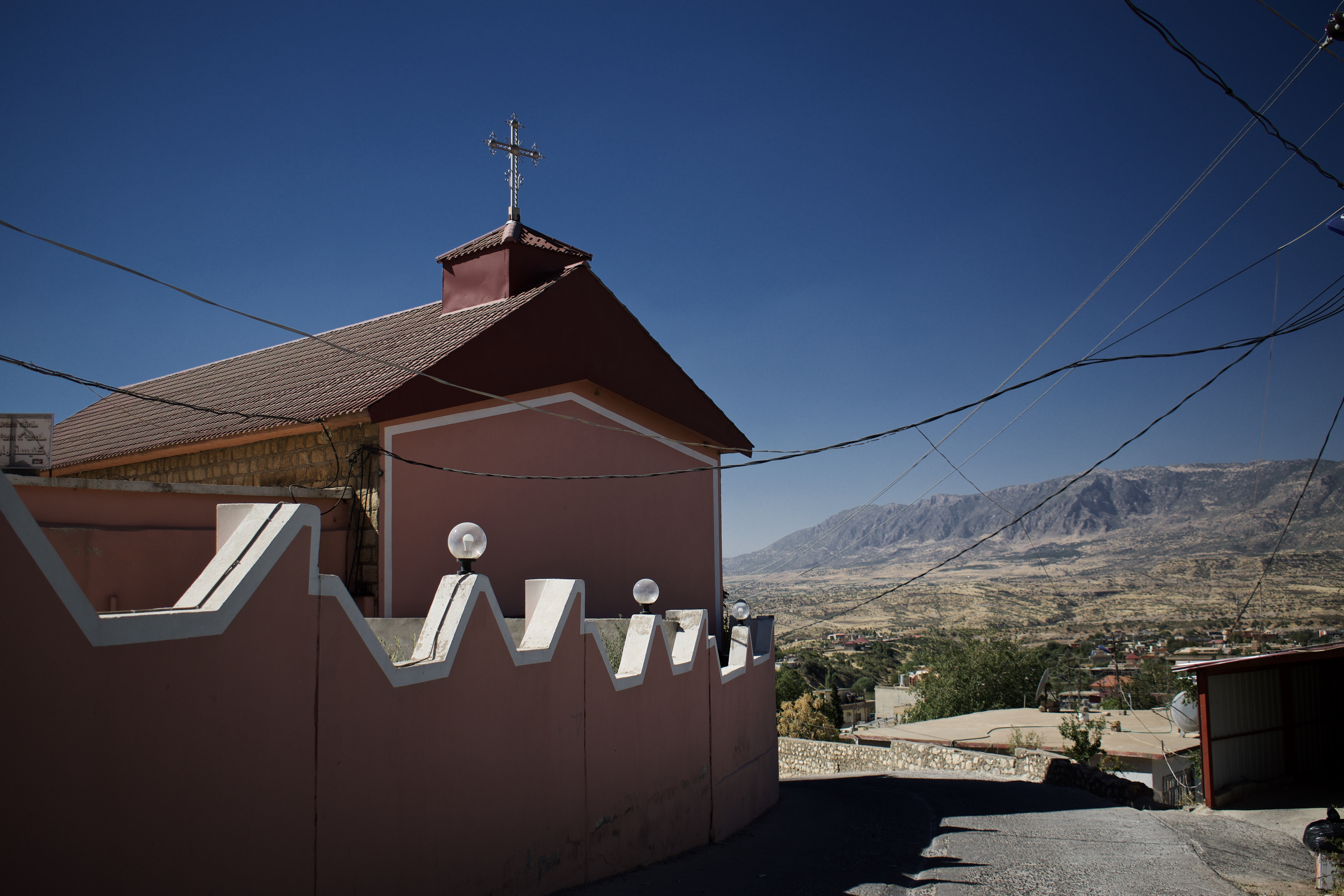
Assyrian church of Mar Mattai in Sarsing.

Iraq

- Babilo (Shawutnaye)
- Bagereh (Selimnaye)
- Chaqala (Kojijnaye)
- Sardarawa (Artusnaye)
- Sorka (Mahaye)
- Simele (Mahaye)
- Badarrash (Artusnaye)
- Sarsing (Artusnaye)
- Sikren (Artusnaye)
- Sedar (Shawutnaye)
- Pirozawa (Argabaye)
- Ain Sifni (Mixed Baznaye)
- Mawana (Mixed Baznaye)

Syria

- Tell Baz (Shawutnaye, Mahaye and some Argabaye)
- Tell Ruman Foqani (Selimnaye and Mahaye)

== Famous people ==
- General Agha Petros Elia - Assyrian military leader during World War I and Chief Negotiator for the Assyrian people during the 1920s.
