= Bir al-Helou =

Bir al-Helou بِئْر الْحِلُو
- Town
- Location of Bir al-Helou in Syria
- Coordinates: 36°41′08″N 41°02′56″E
- Country: Syria
- Governorate: al-Hasakah
- District: al-Hasakah
- Subdistrict: Bir al-Helou al-Wardiya

Population (2004)
  - Total: 3,718
- Time zone: UTC+3 (AST)
- Geocode: C4446

Bir al-Helou (Arabic: بِئْر الْحِلُو, romanized: Biʾr al-Ḥilū) is a town in central al-Hasakah Governorate, northeastern Syria. It is administrative center of the Nahiya Bir al-Helou al-Wardiya consisting of 72 municipalities.

At the 2004 census, Bir al-Helou had a population of 3,718.
