= Tell Tamer bombings =

2015 bombing in Syria

- Part of Syrian Civil War
- Location: Tell Tamer, Al-Hasakah Governorate, Syria
- Date: 11 December 2015
- Attack type: Car bombs
- Deaths: 60
- Injuries: 80
- Perpetrator: Islamic State of Iraq and the Levant

The Tell Tamer bombings occurred on 11 December 2015 after three truck bombs killed 60 people and injured more than 80 in the Rojava controlled town of Tell Tamer in Syria's northeastern Al-Hasakah Governorate. The blasts struck near a Kurdish militia forces field hospital and in the crowded Souk Al Jumla market square, where the majority of the fatalities occurred.
