= Tell Tamer Subdistrict =

Tell Tamer Subdistrict ناحية تل تمر
- Subdistrict
- Location of Tell Tamer Subdistrict within al-Hasakah Governorate

- Location in Syria
- Country: Syria
- Governorate: Hasakah
- District: Hasakah District
- Seat: Tell Tamer

Area
  - Total: 1,111.89 km^{2} (429.30 sq mi)

Population (2004)
  - Total: 50,982
  - Density: 45.852/km^{2} (118.76/sq mi)
- Geocode: SY080001

Tell Tamer Subdistrict (Arabic: ناحية تل تمر) is a subdistrict of Hasakah District in western Hasakah Governorate, northeastern Syria. The administrative centre is the city of Tell Tamer.

At the 2004 census, the subdistrict had a population of 50,982. Assyrians from the Assyrian Church of the East constitute about 40% of the population of this district, with the rest being Kurds and Arabs. It is the headquarter of the Assyrian Khabour Guards and Nattoreh militias, as well as the location of a large Syriac Orthodox Monastery.

== Cities, towns and villages ==
Cities, towns and villages of Tell Tamer Subdistrict
PCode	Name	Population
C4409	Tell Tamer	7,285
—N/a	Ghabshah	2,323
—N/a	Ein Eltineh	1,653
C4436	Qaber Sghir	1,594
C4386	Tawileh	1,409
C4416	Fakkeh	1,380
C4435	Mjeibret Zarkan	1,334
C4431	Tell Jemaah	1,260
C4407	Sukkar Elahimer	1,181
C4424	Derdara	1,140
—N/a	Rakaba	1,136
C4427	Tell Hefyan	1,132
C4398	Umm al-Keif	1,072
C4399	al-Siha al-Wusta	1,025
—N/a	?	933
—N/a	Umm Shaifa	915
—N/a	al-Dawudiyah	856
C4430	Tell Shamiram	811
C4408	Tell Talaah	800
C4415	Nayfeh	763
C4405	Ghorra	758
—N/a	Qaber Shamiyah	734
C4417	Shmuka	700
C4391	Jafr	684
C4421	Tell Tawil	669
—N/a	?	669
C4426	Abu Kabret	667
C4433	Wadi Elnijmeh	661
C4411	Hamaniyeh – Khirbat Eltamer	653
C4393	Tell Nasri	650
C4429	Tell Eljamiliyeh	607
C4419	Tell Fweidat Shamiyeh	587
C4390	Tell Hermez	575
C4418	Khazneh Tal Tamr	565
C4402	Qasemiyeh	514
C4434	Kun Attar	501
—N/a	al-Juwaysh	501
—N/a	?	493
C4400	Tell Hammam Gharbi	472
C4387	Tell Hammam Sharqi	461
C4403	Salmasa	448
C4401	Tell Balouaah	443
—N/a	Tell Fuweidat Jazira	439
C4414	Bab Elfaraj	409
C4437	Madineh Qabliyeh	404
C4422	Tell Ruman	354
—N/a	al-Siha	342
—N/a	Wadi al-Ahmar	323
—N/a	Tell Tal	314
C4392	Tell Sakra	307
C4410	Abu Tinah	301
C4428	Tell Jedaya	301
—N/a	Khirbat Shaib	289
—N/a	Umm Ghargan	275
C4404	Tell Baz	251
C4413	Tell Elmoghor	249
C4423	Tell Massas	231
C4420	Tell Arboush	229
C4385	Maqbara	221
C4396	Tell Nijmeh	210
C4389	Umm al-Masamir	197
—N/a	al-Husainiyah Sharqi	197
C4395	Mutawaseta	194
C4394	Tell Maghas	194
—N/a	Tell Jazira	190
—N/a	Tell Goran	183
C4412	Tell Kifji	181
C4384	al-Rihaniya Gharbi	164
C4388	Tell Shamah	162
C4397	Tell Damshij	153
—N/a	al-Huda	135
C4406	Beida	127
—N/a	al-Mabattuh	120
C4432	al-Kharitah	111
—N/a	Tell Bureij	109
C4425	Tell Makhadah	72
—N/a	al-Siha al-Shamalia	30
