= Bir al-Helou al-Wardiya Subdistrict =

Bir al-Helou al-Wardiya Subdistrict ناحية بئر الحلو الوردية
- Subdistrict
- Location of Bir al-Helou al-Wardiya Subdistrict within al-Hasakah Governorate

- Location in Syria
- Country: Syria
- Governorate: Hasakah
- District: Hasakah District
- Seat: Bir al-Helou

Area
  - Total: 915.05 km^{2} (353.30 sq mi)

Population (2004)
  - Total: 38,833
  - Density: 42.438/km^{2} (109.91/sq mi)
- Geocode: SY080006

Bir al-Helou al-Wardiya Subdistrict (Arabic: ناحية بئر الحلو الوردية) is a subdistrict of Hasakah District in eastern Hasakah Governorate, northeastern Syria. The administrative centre is the municipality of Bir al-Helou. At the 2004 census, it had a population of 38,833.

== Cities, towns and villages ==
Cities, towns and villages of Bir al-Helou al-Wardiya Subdistrict
| PCode | Name | Population |
|---|---|---|
| C4471 | Bir al-Helou | 3,718 |
| C4479 | Sumayhan Gharbi | 3,032 |
| C4494 | Qaemqam Kabir | 2,309 |
| C4455 | Khirab al-Suwayfat | 1,878 |
| C4481 | Daraja | 1,537 |
| —N/a | Abu Kubb | 1,197 |
| C4468 | Khuwaylid Fawqani | 1,159 |
| C4478 | Jasaa | 1,087 |
| C4474 | Kherbet Elrayes | 1,013 |
| C4461 | Tall al-Faras | 867 |
| C4459 | Daffeh | 780 |
| C4482 | Kharab Abdel Sayed | 759 |
| C4484 | Bir al-Helou Elatshaneh | 757 |
| C4456 | al-Asaybikh | 740 |
| —N/a | Sakman al-Ali | 684 |
| C4463 | Umm ar-Rus Shamali | 676 |
| —N/a | Tall Izam | 636 |
| C4475 | al-Sakman | 599 |
| —N/a | ? | 599 |
| —N/a | Tell Zibib | 590 |
| C4472 | Adleh | 564 |
| —N/a | Umm Hajarah al-Wardiyah | 552 |
| —N/a | Khubayrat | 543 |
| —N/a | ? | 529 |
| —N/a | ? | 504 |
| C4460 | Said Bir al-Helou | 477 |
| C4466 | Bweir Bir Helo | 470 |
| —N/a | Khuwaylid Tahtani | 440 |
| C4492 | Madinet Ati | 421 |
| C4465 | Atshana | 415 |
| C4457 | Al-Buwab | 414 |
| C4470 | Bseiriyeh | 394 |
| C4480 | Tall Masti | 394 |
| —N/a | ? | 359 |
| —N/a | Tall Gharbal Tahtani | 358 |
| C4493 | Mithlit | 351 |
| —N/a | Madinat al-Radd | 350 |
| C4490 | Hayahi Kabir | 342 |
| —N/a | ? | 332 |
| C4488 | Hayahi Saghir | 326 |
| —N/a | Khirbat Shaykh Ahmad | 326 |
| C4483 | Umm Hajarah Qulu | 292 |
| C4486 | Tall Shaaban | 291 |
| —N/a | ? | 275 |
| C4476 | Rajm Eltafihi | 274 |
| C4491 | Qaber Elabed | 266 |
| —N/a | ? | 264 |
| —N/a | ? | 240 |
| C4487 | al-Mu'ayzilah | 237 |
| —N/a | al-Hajala | 230 |
| —N/a | Tall Refaat | 226 |
| —N/a | ? | 223 |
| C4469 | Kharab al-Ghazal | 215 |
| —N/a | ? | 191 |
| C4458 | Tall el-Samen | 183 |
| —N/a | as-Sabiryat Bir al-Helou | 175 |
| —N/a | al-Baytik Bir al-Helou | 168 |
| —N/a | al-Fayij | 159 |
| C4462 | Tall el-Abed | 152 |
| C4485 | Kherbet Hawas | 146 |
| C4473 | ash-Shukur | 137 |
| C4464 | Umm Eltawarij | 125 |
| C4477 | Tell Brak | 124 |
| —N/a | ? | 106 |
| —N/a | ? | 102 |
| C4467 | as-Saybat | 100 |
| —N/a | ? | 99 |
| —N/a | ? | 95 |
| —N/a | ? | 89 |
| —N/a | Badr | 62 |
| —N/a | ? | 60 |
| C4489 | Qubaybat | 49 |
