= Tell Tamer =

Town in Syria

Tell Tamer تَلّ تَمْر Girê Xurma ܬܠ ܬܡܪ
- Town
- Location of Tell Tamer in Syria
- Coordinates: 36.6606°N 40.3714°E
- Country: Syria
- Governorate: al-Hasakah
- District: al-Hasakah
- Subdistrict: Tell Tamer

Population (2004)
  - Total: 7,285
- Time zone: UTC+3 (AST)
- Geocode: C4409

Tell Tamer (Arabic: تَلّ تَمْر, romanized: Tall Tamr, Kurdish: گرێ خورما, romanized: Girê Xurma or Til Temir, Syriac: ܬܠ ܬܡܪ) also known as Tal Tamr or Tal Tamir, is a town in western al-Hasakah Governorate, northeastern Syria. It is the administrative center of the Tell Tamer Subdistrict consisting of 13 municipalities.

Originally built and inhabited by Assyrians of the Upper Tyari tribe in the late 1930s, the town is predominantly populated by Arabs, with Assyrians remaining a substantial minority of about 20%. At the 2004 census, Tell Tamer had a population of 7,285.

== Etymology ==
The name of the town, "Tell Tamer", is derived from the Arabic and Aramaic words "tell/tella", both meaning "hill", and "tamer/tamra", both meaning "date". The name of the town therefore means "Hill of Dates".

== Geography ==
In the Khabur Valley of Upper Mesopotamia, Tell Tamer is situated on the left (eastern) bank of Khabur River, just south of the small Zirgan River's estuary. About 3 kilometres (1.9 mi) to the east, the landscape ascends to the Ard al-Shaykh volcanic basalt plateau.

Tell Tamer lies on a direct line between the city of Ras al-Ayn some 35 kilometres (22 mi) to the northwest and the provincial capital al-Hasakah some 40 kilometres (25 mi) to the southeast. The intersection with the M4 highway (Aleppo–Mosul), the major road between al-Hasakah and Diyarbakır (Turkey), and a nearby river crossing make Tell Tamer an essential transport hub.

== History ==
It was settled in the 1930s by Iraqi Assyrian refugees fleeing the Simele massacre in Iraq, who moved to French controlled Syria and settled in a 25 km stretch of the Khabur River in 35 settlements.

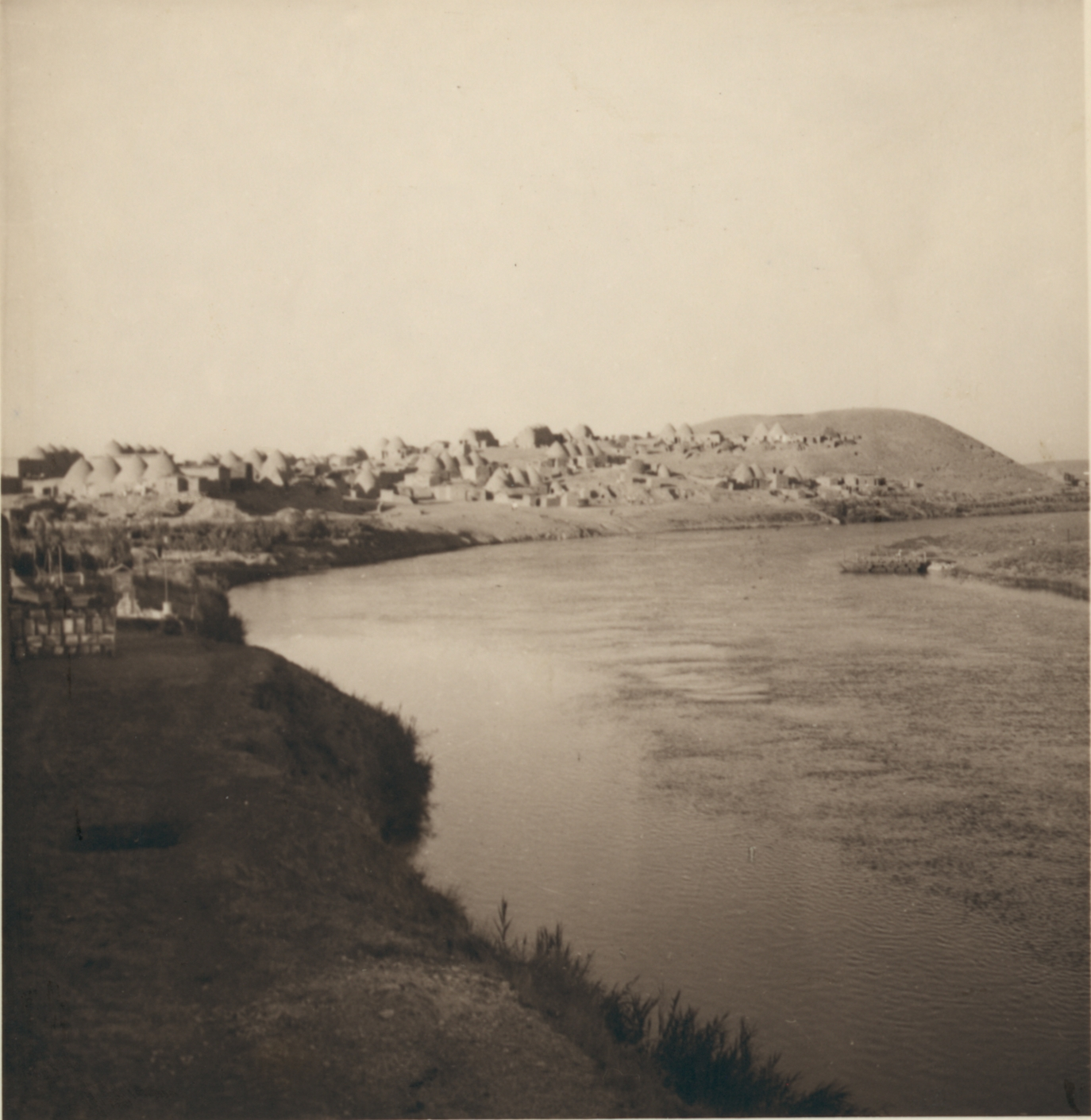
Tal Tamer (1939)

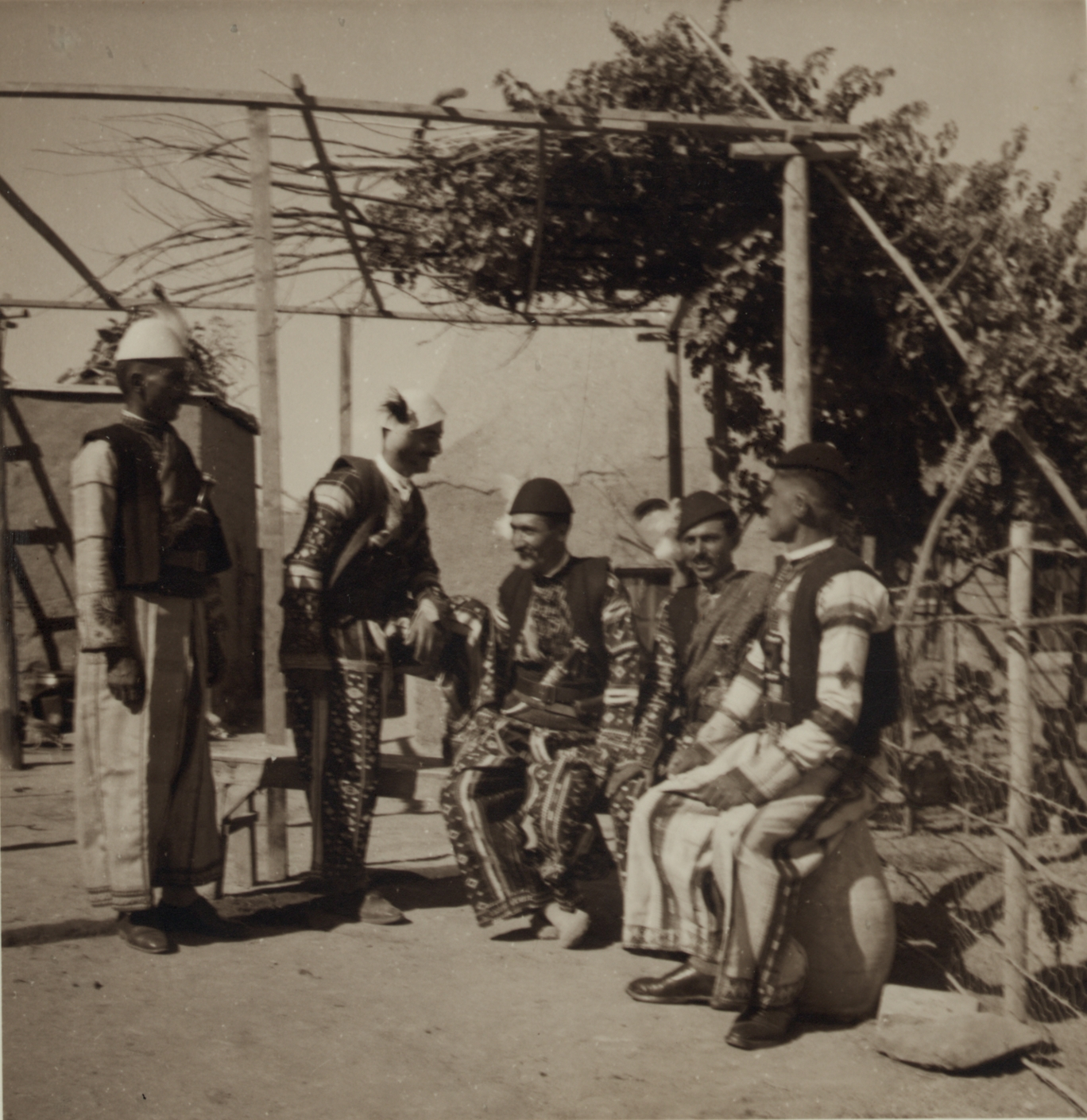
Assyrian men in Tal Tamer (1939)

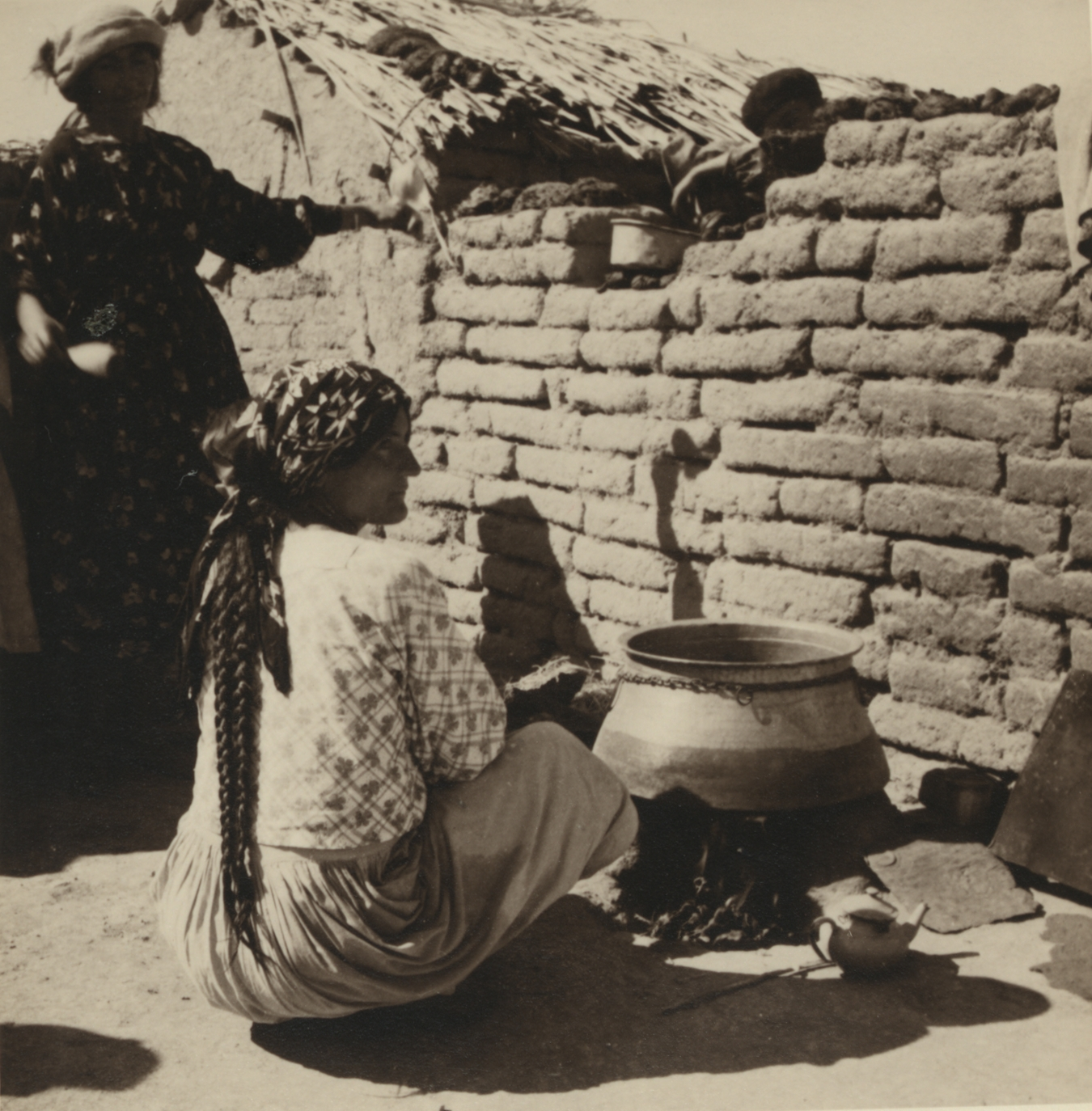
Assyrian woman cooking (1939)

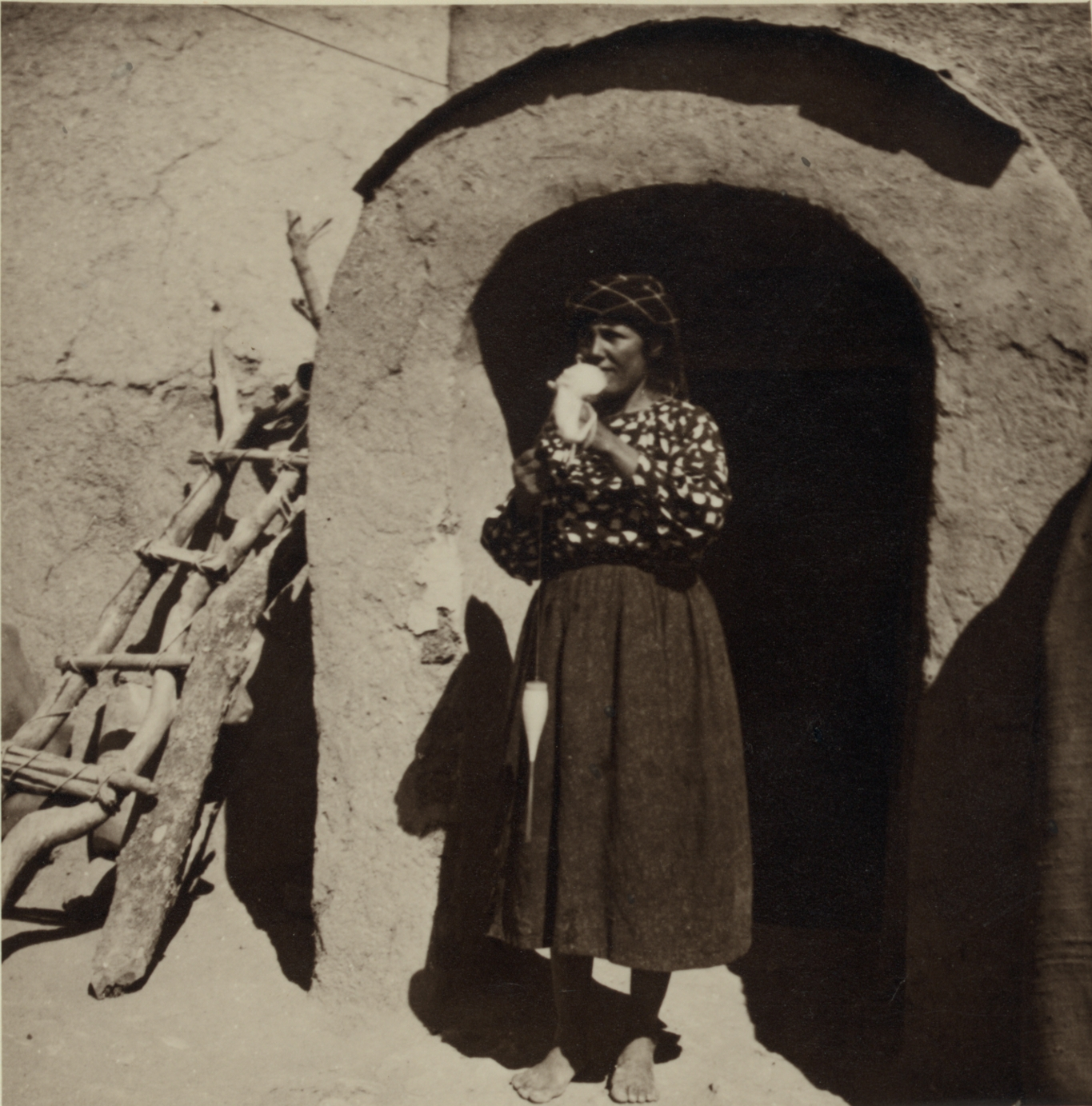
Assyrian woman spinning wool (1939)

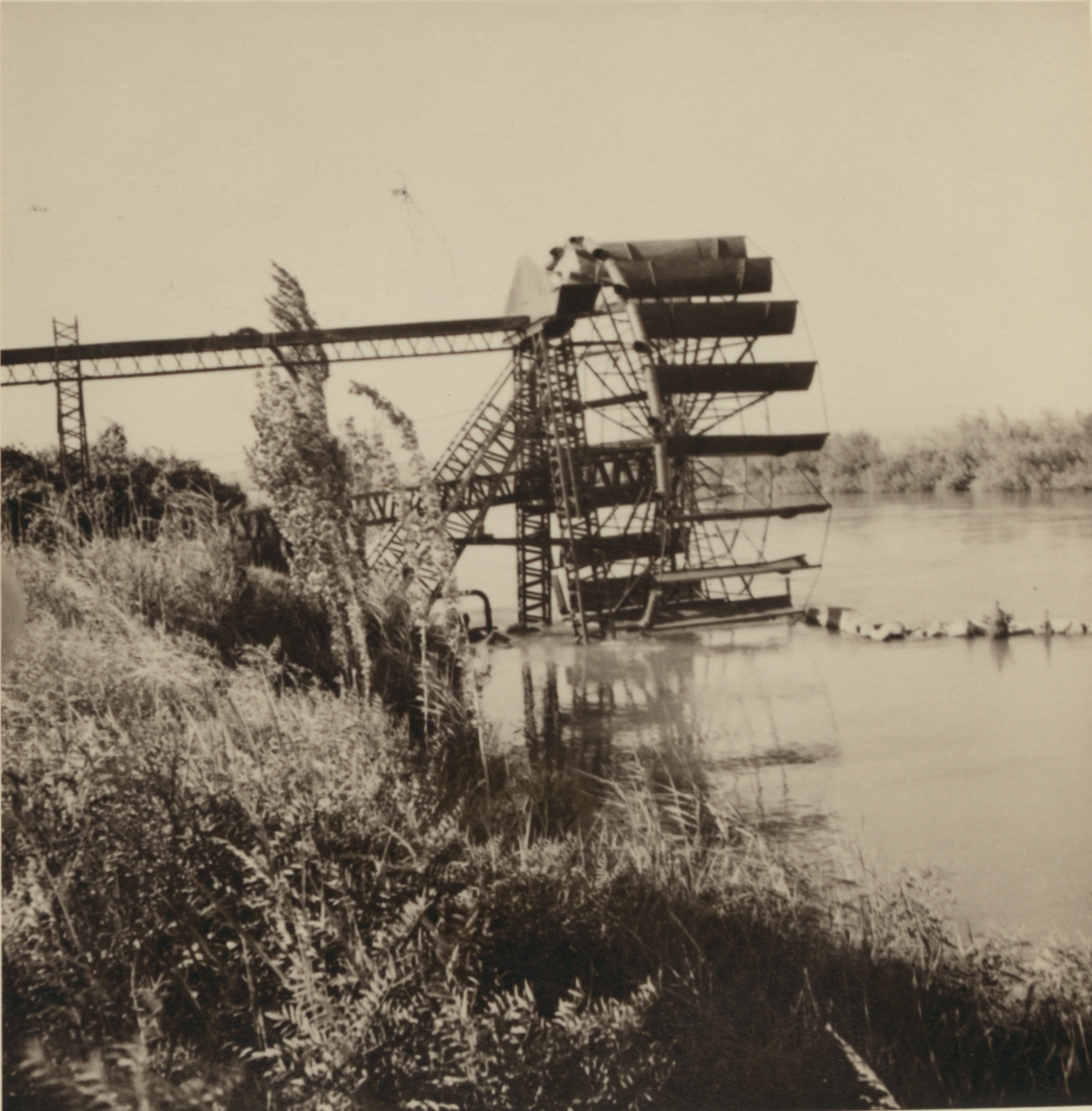
Tal Tamer watermill (1939)

=== Syrian Civil War ===
An Assyrian exodus from the town began in November 2012, when Free Syrian Army (FSA) fighters threatened to invade the town and Al-Nusra front kidnapped a number of Assyrian girls. The exodus further continued when the Islamic State took control of nearby roads just outside the town. This environment led residents to organize local self-defense forces known as the Nattoreh.

In October 2013, four Assyrians were kidnapped by Islamic State (ISIS) militants.

==== Control by Kurdish-led forces ====
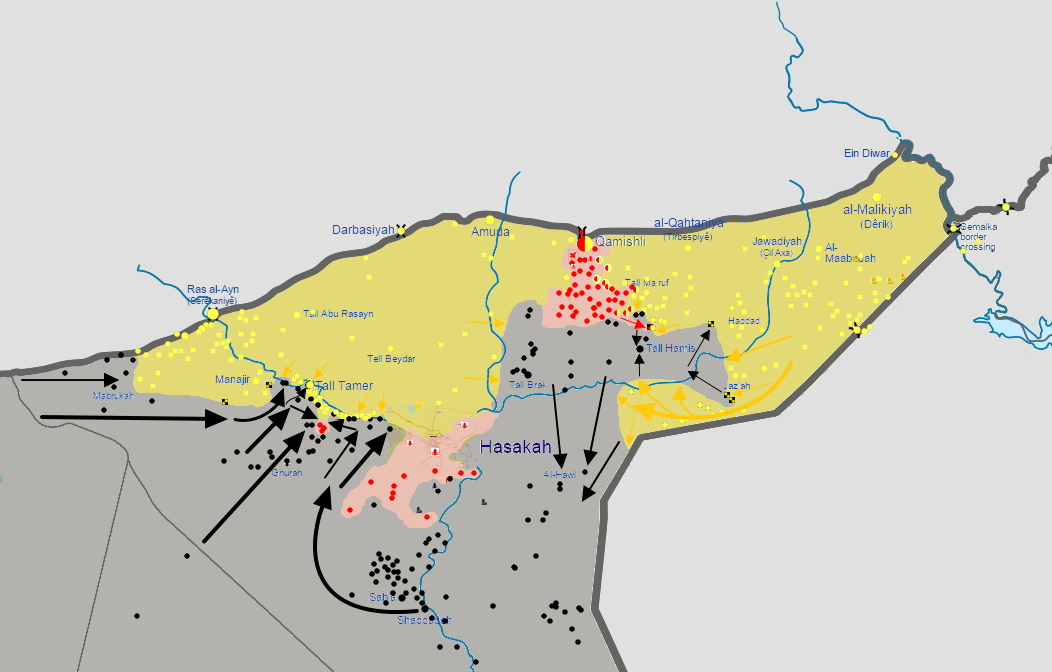
Al-Hasakah offensive in progress, 24 February 2015

According to the Syriac International News Agency, an ISIS attack on a nearby Assyrian village in May 2014 prompted Tell Tamer's residents to request protection from the Kurdish People’s Protection Units (YPG), which led to their deployment to the town. During this period, some youth from Tell Tamer joined YPG-allied Christian militias, including the Syriac Military Council, the Sutoro forces, and the Khabur Guards, while families fled to the Kurdish-held cities of al-Hasakah and Qamishli. Under Kurdish-led administration, Assyrian Christians were permitted to maintain their own political institutions and party offices in the town, including the Assyrian Democratic Party (ADP), which participates in the Syrian Democratic Council (SDC).

After ISIS captured Raqqa in January 2014, some Assyrians from Raqqa and al-Tabqah fled to Tell Tamer, while others from the town also left. Many Assyrian families later emigrated, primarily to the United States, Europe, and Canada.

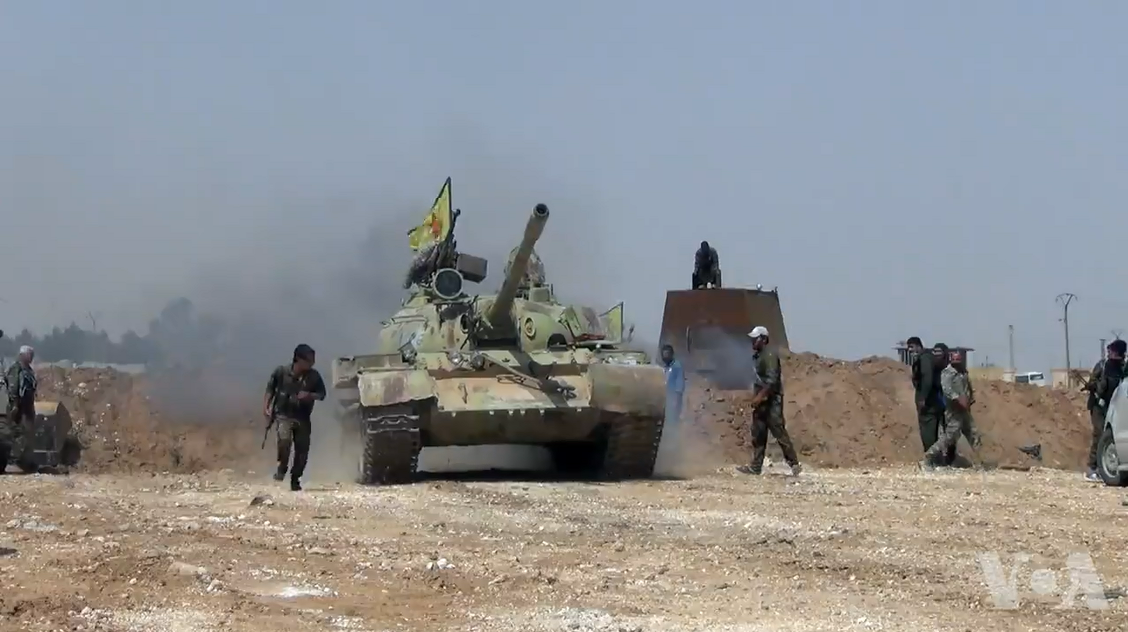
People’s Protection Units (YPG) near Tell Tamer, 22 May 2015.

In February and March 2015, ISIS militants, along with Arab residents from the village of Gêbish, carried out multiple raids on villages in Tell Tamer's vicinity, leading to heavy clashes with the YPG, Women's Protection Units (YPJ), and Assyrian militas during the Eastern and Western al-Hasakah offensive. During these raids ISIS managed to kidnap around 220 Assyrians from villages surrounding Tell Tamer, and by 26 February, that number had increased to 350. Several of these hostages were released by ISIS in late March.

On 7 March 2015, Ivana Hoffmann, a German communist from Duisburg and member of the Marxist–Leninist Communist Party of Turkey/North Kurdistan (MLKP), was killed in Tell Tamer while fighting alongside Kurdish YPG and YPJ forces. She is considered the first German and the first foreign woman to die in combat against ISIS.

On 11 December 2015, three truck bombs killed 60 people and injured more than 80.

On 14 October 2019, Assad regime forces were deployed to Tell Tamer and established joint control following an agreement with the Syrian Democratic Forces (SDF), in wake of the 2019 Turkish offensive into northeastern Syria.

As of May 2026 it's still under Kurdish control.

== Demographics ==
Its original inhabitants are Assyrians from the Upper Tyari tribe, who came to the area from Hakkari region in Turkey via Iraq. As late as the 1960s, they still comprised virtually the entire population of the town. The majority of the town's modern population is composed of Arabs and Kurds, while local Assyrian leaders in the 1990s estimated their own community's presence in the town to be around 20%.

Historical population estimates are as follows: 1,244 (1936); 1,250 (1960); 2,994 (1981); 5,030 (1993); 5,216 (1994); 5,405 (1995).

The pre-war scholarly estimates actually placed the total number of Assyrians belonging to the Assyrian Church of the East living all over of Syria at around 30,000 individuals, with between 15,000 and 20,000 (i.e., 2/3, at most) of them living along the Khabur.

=== Religion ===
The Assyrian "Church of Our Lady", located in the Old Town, at a prominent place near the actual Tell (hill), serves as the center of the Assyrian community. In the early 1980s the original church built of mud-brick in the 1930s was broken down and replaced by a new Italianate-style building. A large green-domed brick mosque built in the 1970s serves the growing Muslim community just to the south of the town center.

== Notable people ==
- Adwar Mousa, prominent Assyrian singer-songwriter.
- Juliana Jendo, prominent Assyrian singer.
- Faia Younan, prominent Assyrian singer.
- Omar Souleyman, prominent Arab singer.

== See also ==
- List of Assyrian settlements
- Tell Tamer bombings
- Eastern al-Hasakah offensive
- Western al-Hasakah offensive

== Bibliography ==
- Dodge, Bayard (1940). "The settlement of the Assyrians on the Khabbur". Journal of the Royal Central Asian Society. 27 (3): 301–320. doi:10.1080/03068374008730969. ISSN 0035-8789.
- Fernandez, Alberto M. (1998). "Dawn at Tell Tamer: The Assyrian Christian Survival on the Khabur River" (PDF). Journal of Assyrian Academic Studies. 12 (1): 34–47. Archived from the original (PDF) on 31 August 2003.
- Rashid, Bedir Mulla (2018) [1st pub. 2017]. Military and Security Structures of the Autonomous Administration in Syria. Translated by Obaida Hitto. Istanbul: Omran for Strategic Studies. Archived from the original on 1 July 2018.
