= Eastern Hasakah offensive =

Military operation in 2015

- Part of the Syrian Civil War, the Rojava–Islamist conflict, and the American-led intervention in Syria
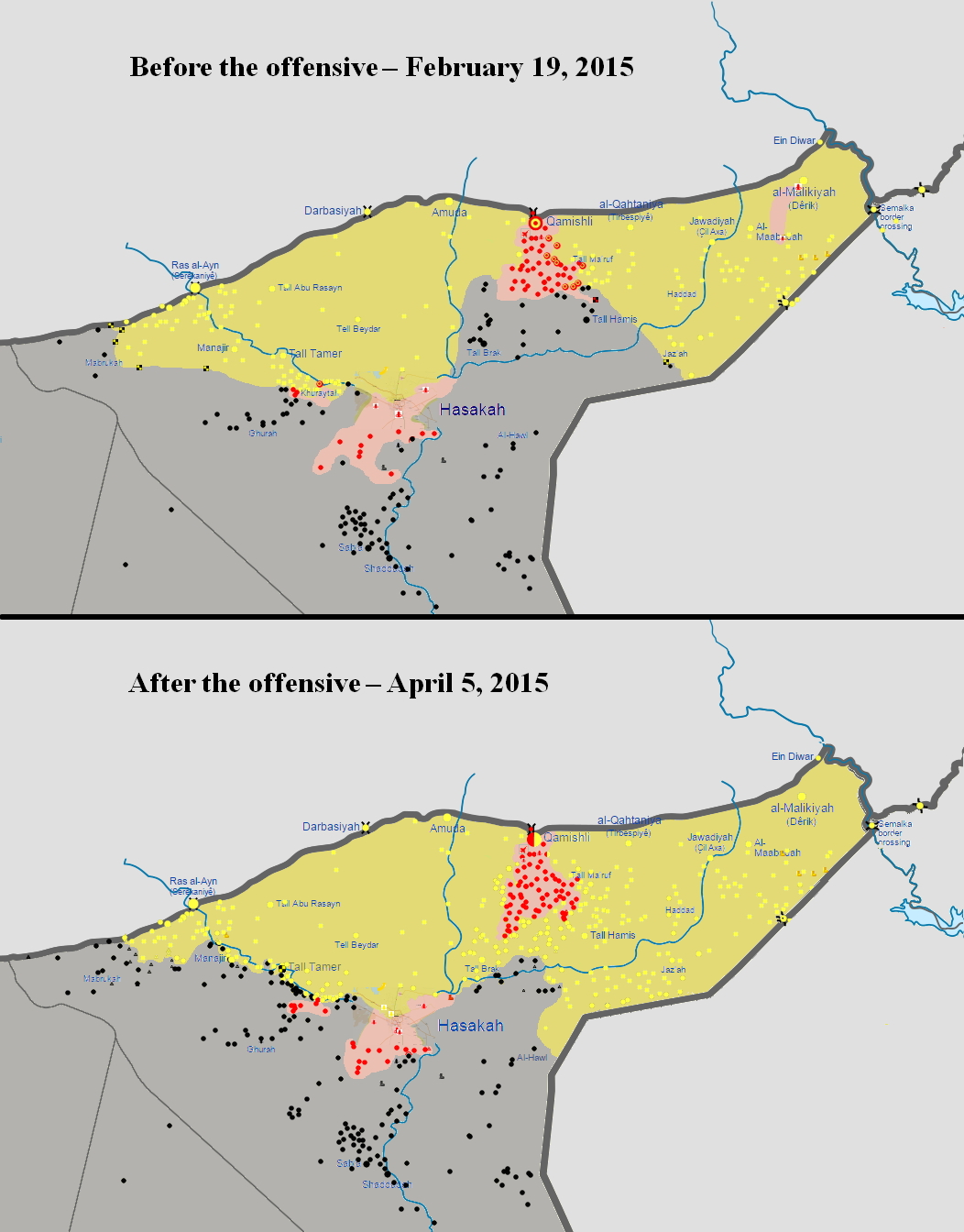
- A map of the territorial changes during the Hasakah offensive
Date	21 February – 10 March 2015 (2 weeks and 3 days)
Location	Eastern Hasakah Governorate, Syria
Result	YPG & Syrian Army victory: ISIL launches a large-scale counteroffensive in western Hasakah Governorate
Territorial changes	Kurdish forces capture Tal Hamis, Tell Brak, and over 103 other villages and hamlets; Syrian government forces capture 38–42 villages on Highway 7; ISIL captures Tell Khanzir and 35 villages around Tell Tamer, and kidnaps 287–400 Assyrians

Belligerents
Rojava; Syriac Union Party; Al-Sanadid Forces; International Freedom Battalion; Supported by: CJTF–OIR; Kurdistan Region (Syria) Syrian Arab Republic; Sootoro	Islamic State

Commanders and leaders
Sipan Hamo (YPG chief commander); Rojda Felat (YPJ commander); Kino Gabriel (MFS chief commander); Suleiman al-Shammari (MFS commander) (Syria) Brig. Gen. Mohammad Khodour (Syria) Maj. Gen. Hassan Mohammad	Abu Ali al-Anbari (Deputy, Syria); Abu Waheeb; Abu Omar al-Shishani (Field commander in Syria); Unknown pro-ISIL tribal leader

Units involved
YPG; YPJ; Syriac Military Council (MFS); Sutoro; Khabour Guards Syrian Army; National Defence Force	(Islamic State) Military of ISIL; al-Barakah Province; Tayy tribal forces; Jibur tribal forces; Khorasan Battalion

Strength
(Democratic Autonomous Administration of North and East Syria) YPG & YPJ: 1,500+ Syriac Military Council (MFS): 1,500; Sutoro: 1,000+ (June 2013)	6,000+

Casualties and losses
155 YPG and allies killed (14 executed), 13 captured	387–423 killed
- 287–400 Assyrian civilians kidnapped (24 released, 1 executed) at least 20,000 civilians displaced

The Eastern Hasakah offensive was launched in the Hasakah Governorate during the Syrian Civil War, by the Kurdish-majority People's Protection Units, Assyrian militias, and allied Arab forces against the jihadist Islamic State (ISIL or ISIS), with the intent of retaking the areas of the Jazira Canton that had been captured by ISIL. Subsequently, the Syrian Armed Forces also launched an assault against the jihadists, without coordinating with the YPG. While the Kurdish forces and the Syrian Government managed to expel the Islamic State from the vast majority of the eastern Hasakah Governorate, including the towns of Tell Hamis and Tell Brak, ISIL launched a large-scale offensive in the western part of the province in response, abducting up to 400 Assyrian Christian hostages.

== Background ==
In February 2014, multiple towns and villages in the eastern part of the Jazira Canton came under ISIL control. On 23 June 2014, ISIL expanded into Tell Brak and the surrounding area, as well as the eastern outskirts of the city of Hasakah. In early October 2014, ISIL launched a massive offensive, capturing some villages in the eastern Jazira Canton, with subsequent campaigns expanding ISIL control in the region into December 2014. In mid-December, the Syrian Army and the YPG engaged ISIL forces to the south of Qamishli, capturing a number of villages, but ISIL responded with a counter-offensive that resulted in them capturing multiple villages to the south and southeast of Tell Ma'ruf. In late December 2014, YPG forces retook control of some of the villages near the Yarubiyah-Rabia border crossing and to the southwest of the region, in support of Peshmerga forces launching the Sinjar offensive. By the end of the offensive on 21 December, some of the ISIL-occupied villages near Jaz'ah had come under YPG assault.

== The offensive ==
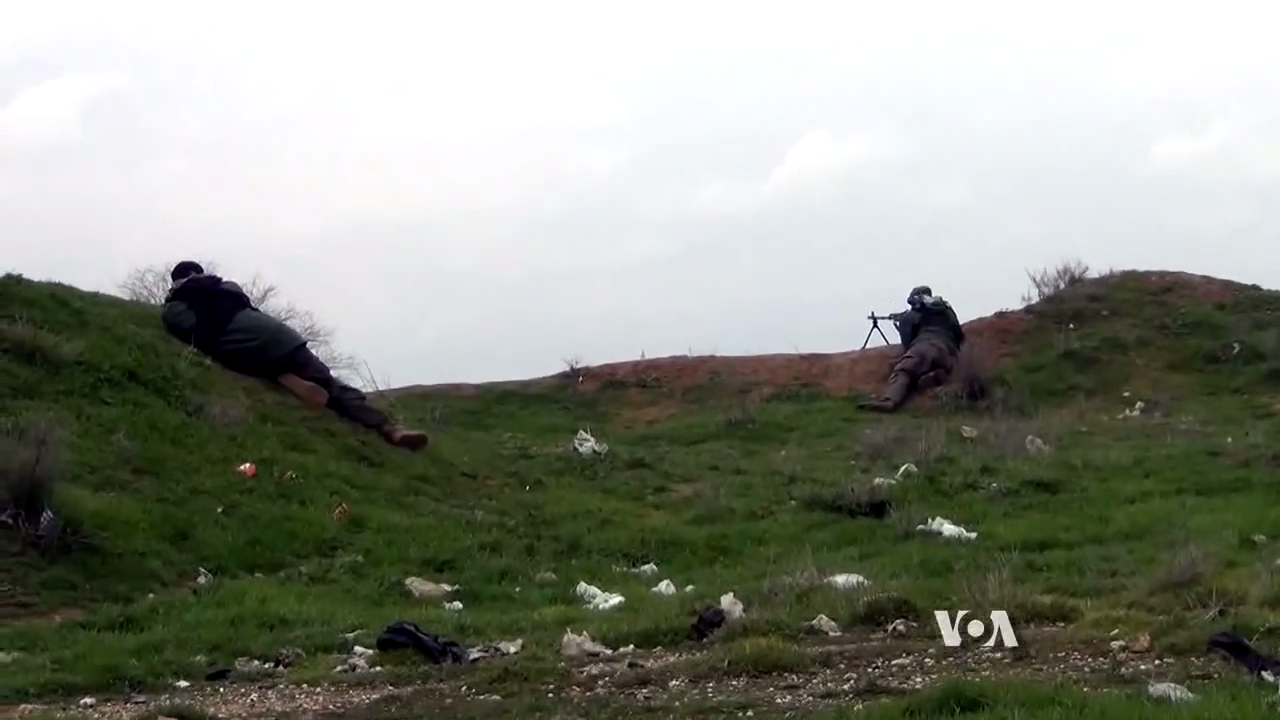
Syriac Military Council fighters near Tell Tamer, February 2015

The offensive started on 21 February 2015, and by the next day, the Kurds quickly advanced within five kilometers of Tal Hamis, after capturing 23 farms and villages near the Abo Qasayeb area. Their assault was backed up by U.S. and allied Arab air support. Also, near the border with Iraq, the YPG captured two villages. The Kurdish Peshmerga forces in Iraq shelled ISIL positions across the border, in coordination with the YPG during their advance.

In response to the Kurdish offensive, on 23 February, ISIL launched a massive attack on a cluster of villages along the southern bank of the Khabur River around the town of Tell Tamer, using around 3,000 fighters and multiple tanks, seizing 11 villages and kidnapping 220 Assyrians by 26 February, according to the SOHR. Local sources stated that 33–35 villages were captured and put the number of abducted Assyrians at 350–400. ISIL was reportedly withdrawing militants from other fronts in Syria, including the front at Homs, to boost their assault at Tell Tamer. The Kurds managed to recapture several of the villages, but the fate of the Assyrians remained unknown. It was also reported that Abu Omar al-Shishani, ISIL's field commander in Syria, was leading the assault at Tell Tamer.

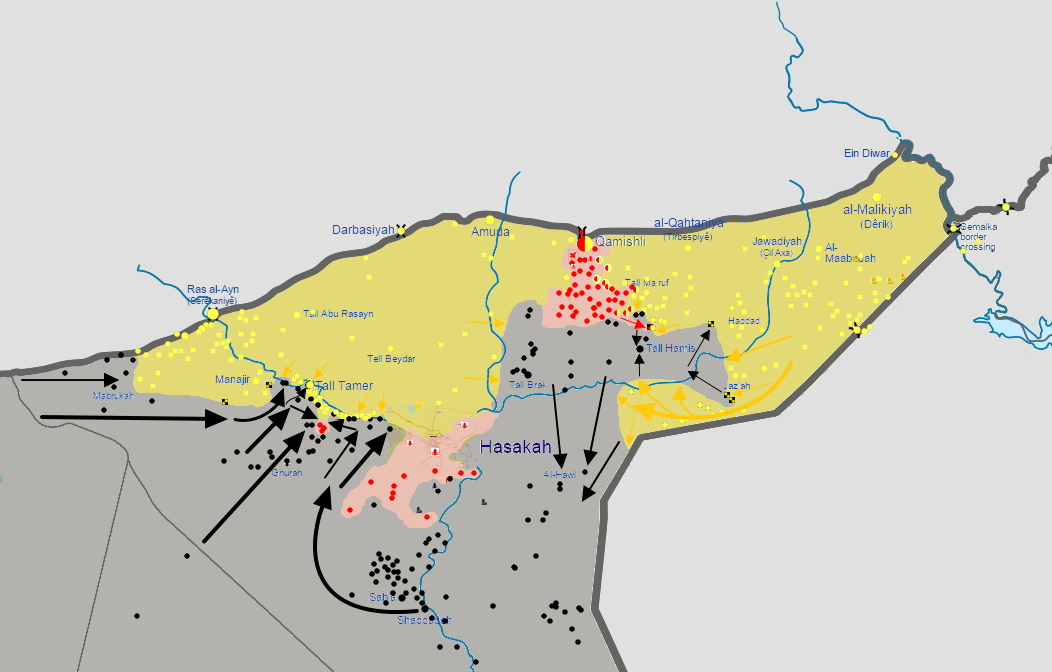
Map of the Hasakah offensive in progress, on 24 February 2015, showing the YPG and ISIL offensives on both sides of the Governorate.

On 23 February, the YPG captured Tell Brak, during a pre-dawn raid On 25 February, the YPG cut the road between Tal Hamis and al-Hawl, which was a main ISIL supply line from Iraq. By 27 February, Kurdish fighters managed to capture 103 villages and hamlets around the town of Tal Hamis, as well as Tal Hamis itself while on 1 March, Kurdish fighters reportedly burned a number of houses that belonged to ISIL militants or ISIL-allied fighters in two dozen Arab villages around Tal Hamis that they recaptured from ISIL. On 28 February, ISIL executed 15 Assyrians, 14 of them fighters. Another 13 Christian fighters were being held.

By 28 February, since the start of the offensive, the fighting had left at least 175–211 ISIL militants and 75 Kurdish and allied fighters dead. In the period during the offensive, between 21 February and 1 March, the US-led coalition conducted 24 airstrikes, striking 18 ISIL tactical units and destroying seven ISIL vehicles.

Kurdish forces were reportedly planning to build on their advances and capture Tell Abyad, thus connecting the Kobanî Canton to the Jazira Canton.

In the meantime, on the same day that the Kurds captured Tal Hamis, Syrian government forces launched their own offensive against ISIL, and by 2 March, had captured 23–31 villages, with their ultimate aim being to take control of the main road linking the provincial capital of Hasakah to the city of Qamishli. Another report put the number of captured villages at 33. 13 of the villages were seized within 24 hours of the start of the assault. Meanwhile, Kurdish-Arab allied forces were continuing to fight ISIL outside Tell Tamer.

By 3 March, 24 of the kidnapped Assyrians were released by ISIL after ransoms were paid.

On 4 March, Syrian government forces advanced further and captured several villages, while ISIL continued shelling Kurdish fighters near Tell Tamer. After the losses suffered in the previous days, ISIL forces retreated towards the areas of al-Hawl and Shaddadi.

On 6 March, the Syrian Army advanced down Highway 7 up to 15–20 kilometers from Tell Brak and stopped. It was also reported that fierce clashes between ISIL and the YPG had erupted to the east of Hasakah city, as ISIL was trying to prevent Kurdish forces from reaching one of its last remaining strongholds in al-Hawl. The clashes from 5–6 March resulted in the deaths of 11 more YPG fighters.

On 7 March, ISIL launched a massive attack on villages around Tell Tamer, with fears ISIL militants would use the kidnapped Assyrians as human shields. The attack began around dawn and targeted at least three villages on the northern bank of the Khabur River, with ISIL's aim being to capture Tell Tamer and secure a corridor to the Iraqi border. The next day, ISIL advanced close to the town and heavy fighting ensued, but Kurdish reinforcements arrived and they managed to repel the militants. The clashes left 40 dead on both sides. At the same time, ISIL launched an assault in an attempt to recapture several villages between Tell Brak and al-Hawl, which was also repelled, with the YPG claiming to have killed 67 ISIL militants. Meanwhile, Syrian government troops advanced further and captured five to nine villages.

By this point, among Kurdish fighters killed in the offensive, there were three foreigners as well: an Australian, a Briton and a German female volunteer.

On 10 March, the YPG announced that their campaign had ended successfully, after securing the Jazira Canton. However, on the same day, ISIL launched a surprise attack on Tell Khanzir, about 30 kilometers to the west of Ras al-Ayn, near the Turkish border in west Hasakah, capturing the town along with several other villages. It was reported that ISIL had deployed hundreds of battle-hardened Chechens from its Khorasan Battalion to carry out the assault. Fierce clashes also erupted in and around Manajir, to the west of Tell Tamer, as ISIL sought to strike northward. ISIL launched the assault to prevent Kurdish forces from reaching their stronghold of al-Hawl, by occupying the Kurds on multiple fronts, attempting to seize another border crossing with Turkey, and due to fears that the Kurds would use Ras al-Ayn as a base to seize control of Tell Abyad, and link the Kobanî and Jazira Cantons. ISIL also wanted control of Ras al-Ayn and Tell Tamer to control additional key routes that would link the ISIL-held Iraqi city of Mosul with other ISIL-controlled territory in northeastern Syria.

== Aftermath ==
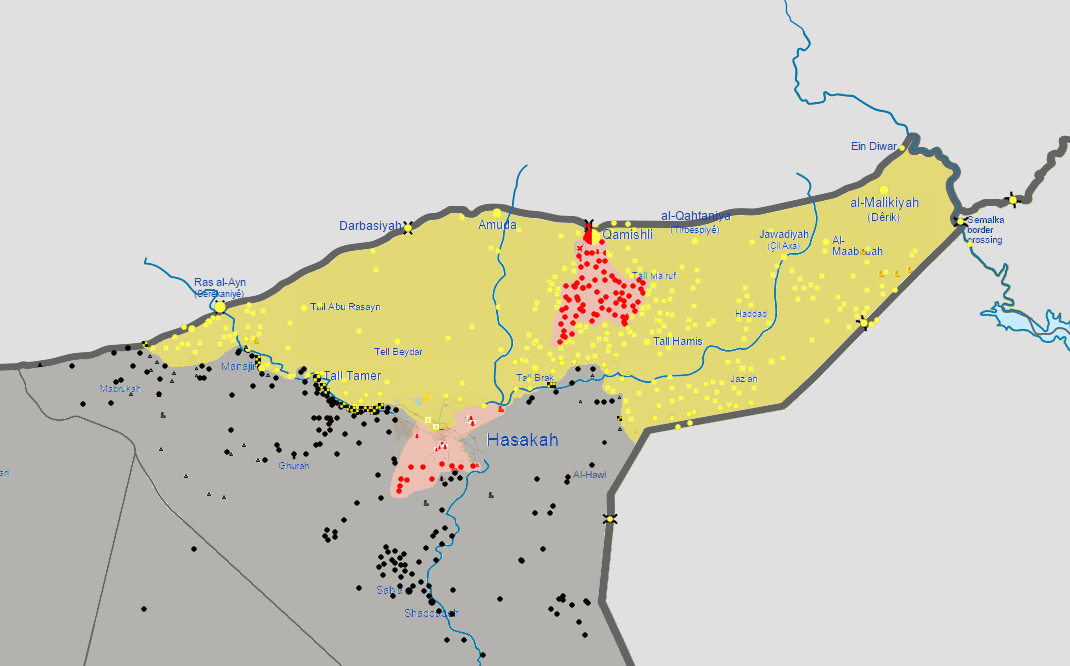
Map of the maximum gains made by ISIL advances during the Hasakah offensive, by mid-April 2015.

On 12 March, the Kurds managed to repel the ISIL advance on Ras al-Ayn, resulting in dozens of casualties on both sides. However, ISIL advanced towards Tell Tamer and captured the village of Tal Nasri, bringing the militants to within 500 meters of the town. The fighting near Tell Tamer left 22 Kurdish and 18 jihadist fighters dead. Two days later, the Kurds recaptured the village of Tal Maghas, near Tell Tamer; however, according to another report, ISIL managed to capture several more villages and crossed the Khabur River, in the area just northwest of Tell Tamer. The YPG demanded more Coalition airstrikes in the region, due to the fact that ISIL was deploying more reinforcements while the US-led Coalition had not conducted any airstrikes near Tell Tamer since 10 March. By this point, since the ISIL counterattack started on 10 March, the clashes in the Tell Tamer and Tell Khanzir areas had left at least 105 ISIL militants and 63 YPG fighters dead. On 13 March, the US-led Coalition resumed airstrikes in the region.

On 16 March, the YPG advanced and captured some ISIL positions in the countryside around Tell Tamer. The same day, 100 Hezbollah fighters arrived in Ras al-Ayn from Qamishli to support Kurdish forces, according to the pro-opposition Hasakah Youth Union, and were soon after sent to the battlefield where they were outfitted with Kurdish uniforms. The next day, the Iranian Fars News Agency reported that the Syrian Army advanced and captured the town of Malaha, as well as its surrounding farm areas.

From 18 to 19 March, US-led Coalition airstrikes struck 3 ISIL tactical units, an ISIL fighting position, and an ISIL tunnel system in the area.

On 20 March, more than 100 people were killed and wounded when an ISIL militant blew himself up at a celebration held by the Kurds for the festival of Nowruz, in the al-Mofti neighborhood of Hasakah city, in addition to an IED explosion at another celebration in the city.

Over the next several days, clashes erupted in the vicinity of Tell Khanzir, Tell Brak and Tell Tamer, killing dozens of ISIL militants, while fighter jets bombed ISIL positions in the city of Al-Shaddadeh.

On 30 March, the National Defense Forces (NDF) reportedly captured 33 villages near the village of Tal Brak in rural Hasakah, after fierce clashes with ISIL militants on 28 and 29 March. On the same day, Kurdish commander Jiwan Ibrahim, Chief of the Kurdish Asayish forces in Rojava, issued a warning to civilians in the recently regained towns of Tel Brak and Tel Hamis regarding Syrian government forces in the region: “To our people in Tel Brak and Tel Hamis, the Baathist regime (Assad’s regime) in Qamishli and Hasakah is spreading baseless news that it took entire control of both towns and handed them over to Kurdish forces. However, Kurds have fought against the radical group of the Islamic State (IS/ISIL) and forced the militants to withdraw from the towns, and Kurds are the ones who protect these towns. The regime militias weren’t engaged in the fighting against the IS group and they won’t provide any security assistance to the civilians”.

On 3 April, ISIL reportedly lost another 21 villages to Syrian government forces, to the south of Qamishli.

On 6 May, the Kurdish forces launched a counteroffensive to retake their lost towns and villages, and to expel ISIL from the western Hasakah Province, managing to push into the northern Raqqa Governorate on 31 May.

== See also ==
- Sinjar massacre
- Northern Iraq offensive (August 2014)
- December 2014 Sinjar offensive
- November 2015 Sinjar offensive
- Siege of Kobanî
- Battle of Sarrin (March–April 2015)
- Qalamoun offensive (May–June 2015)
- Palmyra offensive (May 2015)
- Western Hasakah offensive
- Hasakah city offensive
- Tell Abyad offensive
- Battle of Sarrin (June–July 2015)
- Battle of Hasakah (2015)
- 26 June 2015 Islamist attacks
  - Kobanî massacre
- Autonomous Administration of North and East Syria
- War against the Islamic State
- List of wars and battles involving ISIL
- List of terrorist incidents linked to ISIL
- October 7 attack – Another terrorist attack in which large numbers of civilians were abducted
