= Assyrians in Syria =

Ethnic group

ܣܘܪ̈ܝܝܐ ܕܣܘܪܝܐ (Syriac)
- (Assyrian homeland)
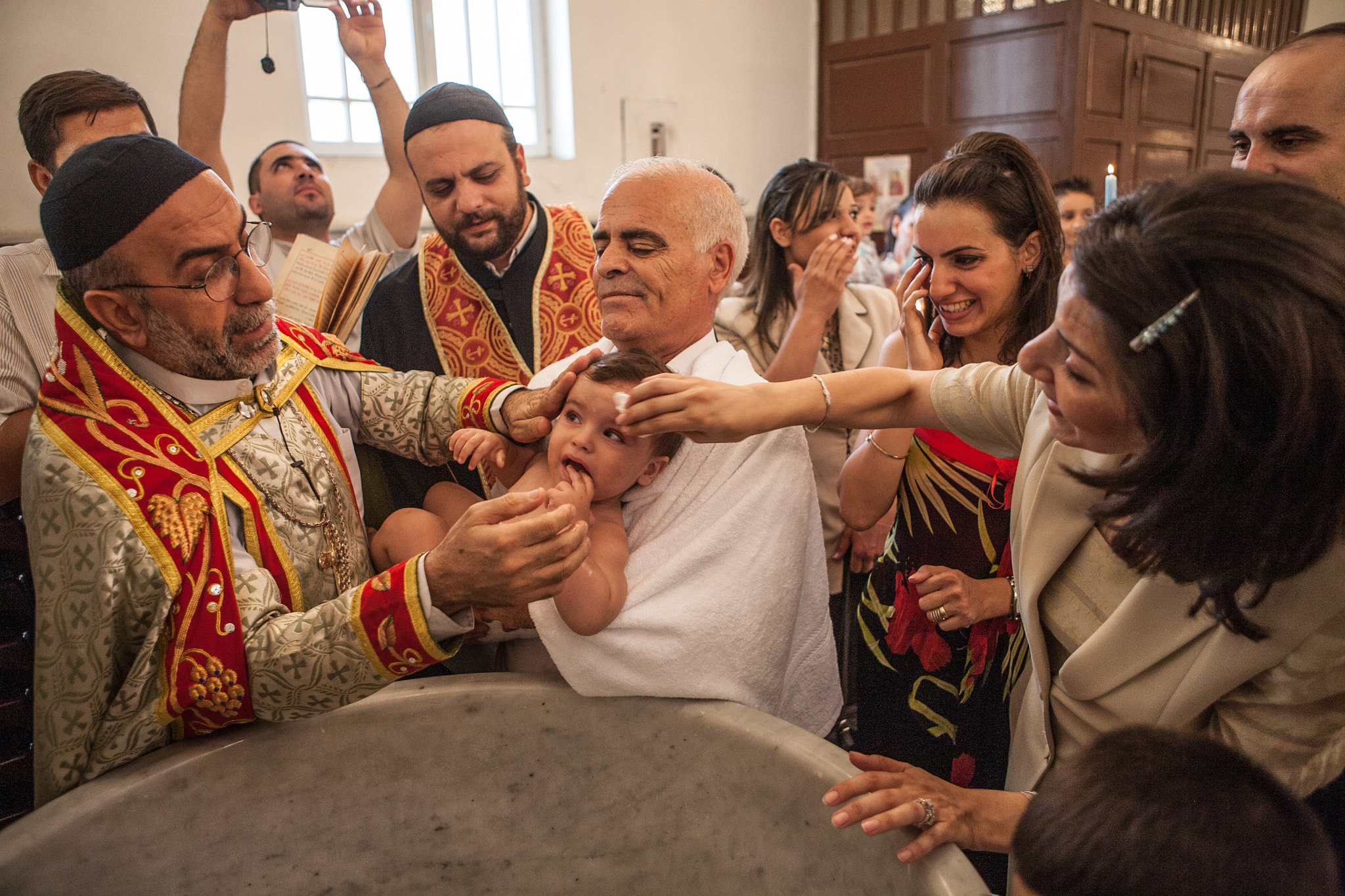
- Assyrian Christian baptism in Syria

Total population
- 400,000-877,000 (2026 estimate)

Regions with significant populations
- Al-Hasakah Governorate, Damascus, Homs, Aleppo

Languages
- Turoyo, Sureth and North Mesopotamian Arabic

Religion
- Syriac Christianity (Syriac Orthodox Church, Assyrian Church of the East, Chaldean Catholic Church, Syriac Catholic Church)

Assyrians in Syria (Syriac: ܣܘܪ̈ܝܝܐ ܕܣܘܪܝܐ, Arabic: الآشوريون في سوريا) are an ethnic and linguistic minority indigenous to Upper Mesopotamia, the north-eastern half of Syria. Syrian-Assyrians are people of Assyrian descent living in Syria, and those in the Assyrian diaspora who are of Syrian-Assyrian heritage.

They live primarily in Al-Hasakah Governorate, with a significant presence in Hasakah city and the cities of Qamishli, Malikiyah, Ras al-Ayn, and Qahtaniyah, as well as in Tell Tamer and nearby villages. Some have migrated to Damascus and other western cities beyond the border of their indigenous Mesopotamia at the Euphrates River. They share a common history and ethnic identity, rooted in shared linguistic, cultural and religious traditions, with Assyrians in Turkey, Assyrians in Iraq and Assyrians in Iran, as well as with the Assyrian diaspora.

== History ==
=== Ancient history ===
During the Old Assyrian Empire (2000–1750 BC), Middle Assyrian Empire (1365–1020 BC) and Neo Assyrian Empire (911–599 BC) much of, and often the entirety of the modern country of Syria, was under Assyrian rule, which founded in Northwestern Mesopotamia (modern-day Iraq). The northeastern part of the land became an integral part of Assyria proper during the 2nd millennium BC. Thus the presence of originally Akkadian-speaking and later Eastern Aramaic-speaking Assyrians in the northeastern part of the modern country dates back over 4000 years, where they lived alongside a diverse set of other peoples such as Hittites, Hurrians and Amorites throughout the ages. Traces of the long era of Assyrian settlement can be seen at numerous archaeological sites across the region. Important Assyrian cities in the region in ancient times include Til-Barsip, Carchemish, Guzana, Shubat-Enlil and Dur-Katlimmu.

The northeast of modern-day Syria was a part of Achaemenid Assyria (Athura) which was a geographical area within the Achaemenid Empire in Mesopotamia between 546 and 332 BC, then Seleucid Syria (312-150 BC), when the name Syria which was originally a 9th-century BC Indo-European corruption of Assyria and had hitherto referred only to Assyria itself, also became applied to a region long known as Aramea/Eber Nari. During the Parthian Empire (150 BC-224 AD) and early Sassanid Empire (224 -650 AD) (when the land was renamed Assuristan) a number of Neo-Assyrian kingdoms arose, and parts of northeast Syria became a part of the Neo-Assyrian state of Osroene until the mid-3rd century AD. Christianity became established amongst the Assyrians as early as the 1st century AD, and the region of Athura became the birthplace of Eastern Christianity and Syriac literature, with the Assyrian Church of the East and Syriac Orthodox Church being founded in the region.

=== Middle Ages ===
After the Arab Islamic Conquest of the mid-7th century AD, Assyria/Athura/Assuristan was dissolved as a geo-political entity, and the region gradually saw an influx of Muslim Arab, Turkic and Iranic peoples. However, settlement in the northeastern areas often proved unsustainable in the long-term, leading to numerous episodes of population exodus. In addition to experiencing such destabilising factors such as climate shifts and over-cultivation of land, the area was also vulnerable to attack from nomadic peoples. Following the Mongol and Timurid invasions and subsequent massacre of Assyrians, it was left with only a scant permanent population. In the centuries that followed, a number of nomadic and semi-nomadic Arabic- and Kurdish-speaking tribes wandered the area with their livestock into the 20th century, when most of them were forced to settle by governmental policies.

=== Early modern period ===
When the Ottoman Empire conducted ethnic cleansing against its Christian populations, Kurds were responsible for most of the atrocities against Assyrians. At the onset of the 20th century, Kurdish tribes cooperated with the Ottoman authorities in the genocides against Armenian and Assyrian Christians in Upper Mesopotamia. Many Assyrians from Hakkari settled in Syria after they were displaced and driven out by Ottoman Turks in the early 20th century. During the 1930s and 1940s, many Assyrians resettled in northeastern Syrian villages, such as Tel Tamer, Al-Qahtaniyah, Al Darbasiyah, Al-Malikiyah, Qamishli and a few other small towns in Al-Hasakah Governorate.

=== Modern history ===
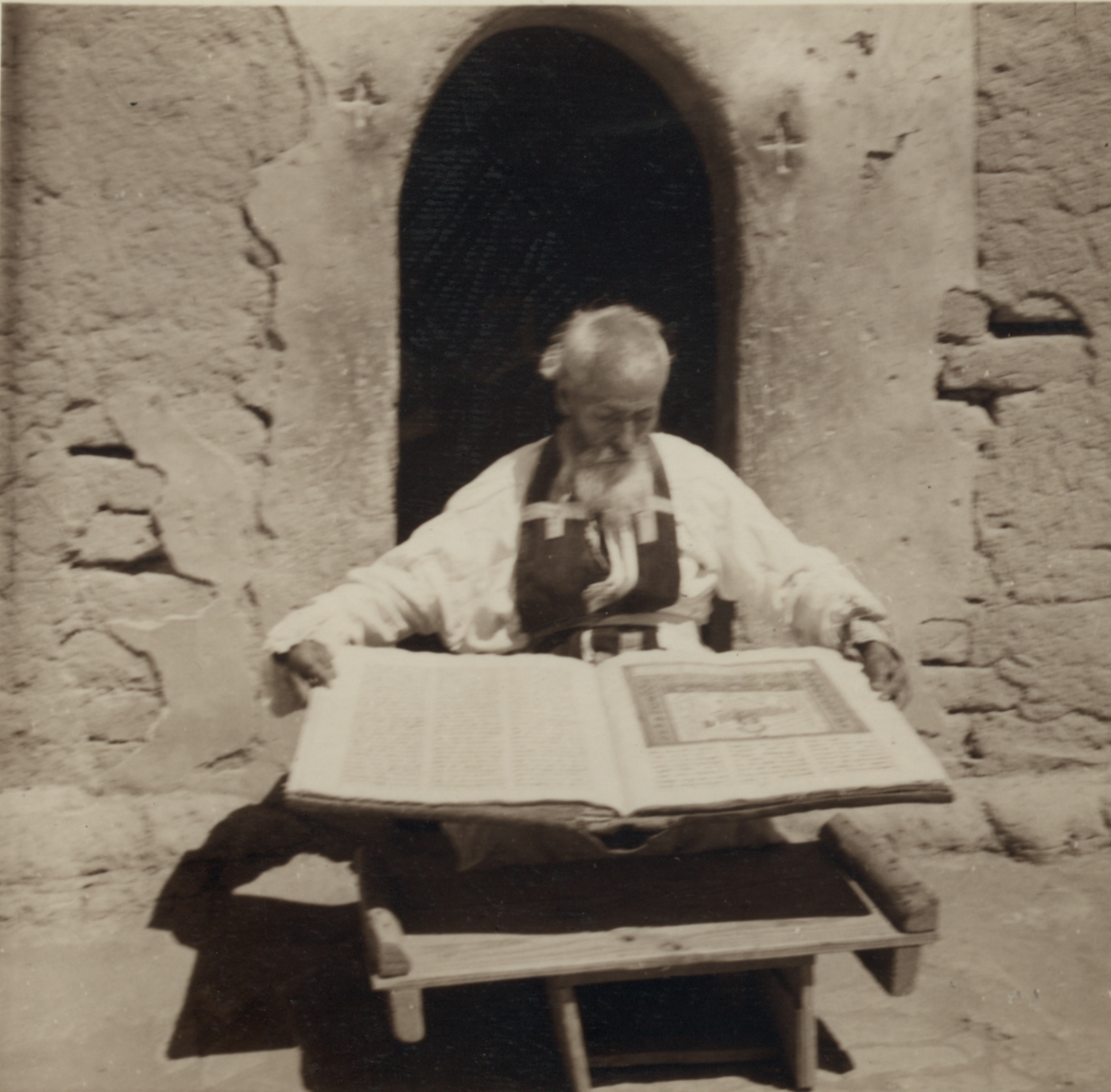
Assyrian priest with manuscript, Khabur river valley area, 1939

Most of the current population of Assyrians in Hasakah dates back to the French Mandate of Syria, when refugees from the now-Turkish areas north of present-day Syria (such as Tur Abdin) were settled together with displaced Armenians who had survived the Assyrian genocide and Armenian genocide in the area by the authorities as part of an effort to promote economic development. Given preferential treatment on the basis of their Christian religion by the French, they soon formed most of the new urban elite in the region. An additional influx of Eastern Assyrians began to resettle along the Khabur River in 1933 after the massacres of Assyrians in newly independent Iraq (see Simele massacre) forced the flight. These were refugees twice over—originally from the highlands of Hakkari, they had initially sought refuge amongst other Assyrians in Iraq in the face of the Assyrian genocide before the attacks.

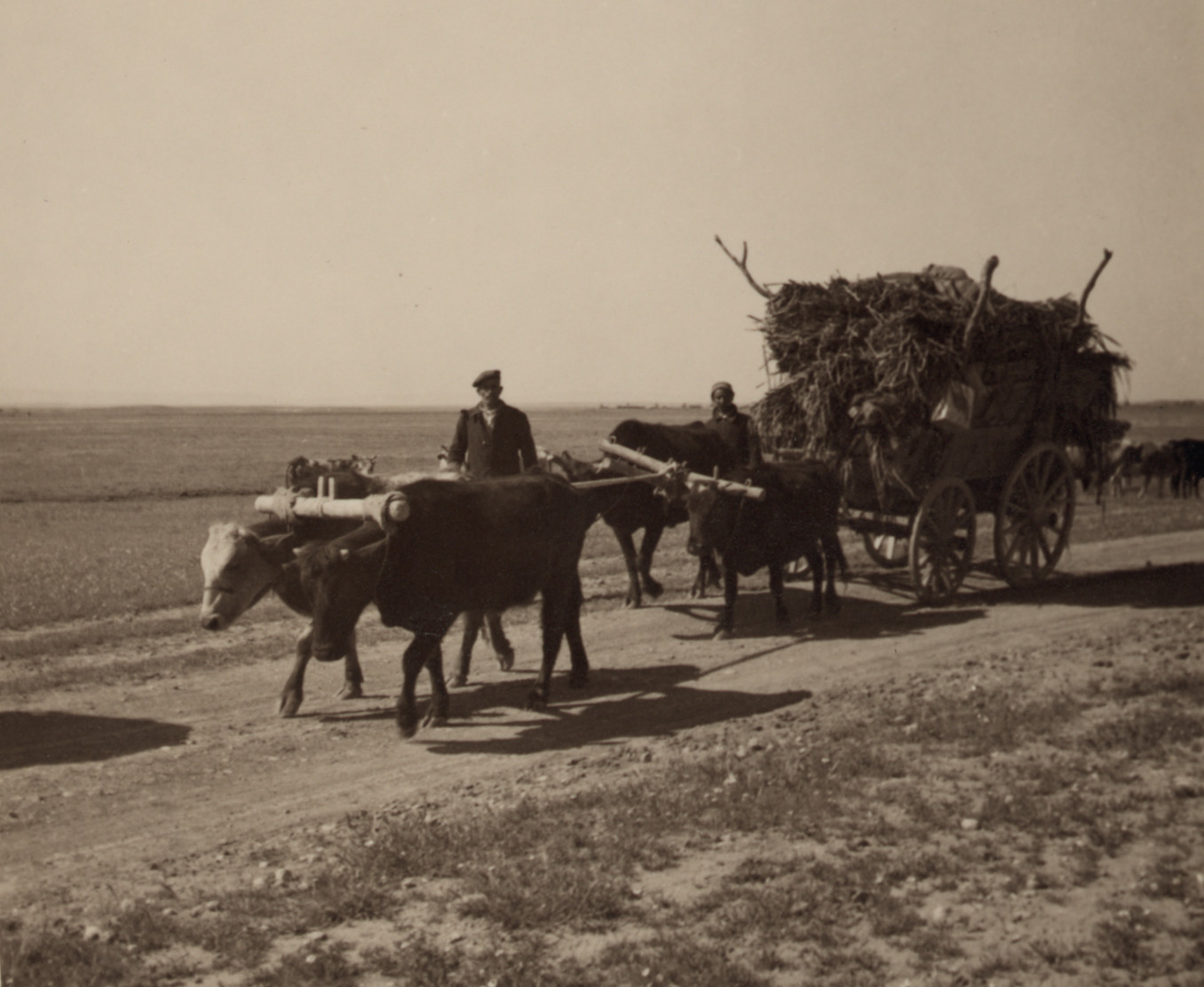
Assyrian refugees travelling to Khabur after escaping the Simele massacre

In 1936, religious and political leaders—mainly from the Assyrian and Armenian Christian and Kurdish communities, with a few Arab groups as well—pressured the French authorities to give autonomous status to the Syrian Al-Jazira province (nowadays the Al Hasakah) for its mixed-ethnic population, like in the Sanjak of Alexandretta, the Alawite State, or Jabal al-Druze. The push for autonomy was marked by civil strife and inter-communal violence in the province, and angry hostility on the part of the mainly Arab nationalists pushing for outright independence for Syria. Long having viewed the settlement of Assyrians and Armenians in the country as the product of French colonialism, they were further incensed by the arrival of additional Assyrian refugees on the Khabur, and mobilized support from many Arab tribes and some Kurdish groups to counter the autonomists. The French forcibly cracked down on both sides as they grew increasingly violent, and the movement for autonomy soon failed. Later on, in 1957, the Assyrian Democratic Organization was set up in Syria by center-left intellectuals.

Though officially and incorrectly designated as Arabs by the Syrian Arab Nationalist Baathist government, the Assyrians are a distinct pre-Arab ethnic group with a history in the region dating perhaps as far back as the 25th century BC. They are a Syriac speaking community that traditionally belong to the Ancient Church of the East, Assyrian Church of the East, Syriac Orthodox Church and the Chaldean Catholic Church. The modern Assyrians are native to "northern Iraq, southeastern Turkey, northwestern Iran and northeastern Syria".

First settled by Assyrians fleeing the Assyrian genocide and then the Simele massacre, there are over 30 Assyrian villages on the Khabur river in Syria. According to a 1994 report they are: Tell Tawil, Tell Um Rafa, Tell Um Keff, Tell Kefdji, Tell Djemaa, Tell Tamer, Tell Nasri, Upper Tell Chamran, Lower Tell Chamran, Tell Chamran, Tell Hafian, Tell Talaa, Tell Maghas, Tell Massas, Abu Tine, Tel Goran, Fouedate, Dimchij, Kabar Chamie, Tell Balouet (Dezn), Tell Baz, Upper Tell Rouman, Lower Tell Rouman, El-Kharita, Tell Chame, Tell Wardiat, El-Makhada, Taal, Tell Sakra, El-Breij, Arbouche, and Tell Hormiz. About 9,000 ethnic Assyrians moved from northern Iraq to join already extant Assyrian populations in northeastern Syria following the Simele massacre of 1933. They settled in the Jazirah near Tall Tamir on the upper Khabur River. The French established this Assyrian settlement with the assistance of the League of Nations, and in 1942 it became an integral part of Syria. The Assyrian settlement on the Khabur valley consists of about 20 villages, primarily agricultural. They have faced severe economic pressures over the years, despite owning their own irrigated lands, and some of them immigrated to the US, where there exists a large community.

In an interview with Aid to the Church in Need, bishop Jules Boutros, of the Syriac Catholic Church, said most young Syriacs were trying to get out of Syria. "Most of our young people are trying to get out of Iraq and Syria. (...) Things are worse in Syria, because the war is still going on. Military service is the biggest issue for our young men, because you have to serve for 9 or 10 years. After that time, if you return alive, you need to start from zero. This is in all of Syria. Things are worse in the Kurdish controlled area. Our young men have to serve with the Kurdish military, and then with the Syrian military. That is why in Syria it is so rare to find young men, they are all leaving. After five years abroad, if they pay US$8,000 dollars they can return without their military service. We are losing an entire generation."

== Culture ==
Assyrians celebrate religious holidays such as Easter and Christmas, as well as feasts of saints venerated in their respective churches.

All Assyrians celebrate Assyrian New Year, known as Ha b'Nison or Kha b'Nisan, on the 1st of April each year to celebrate the turn of the new year in the ancient Assyrian calendar. Assyrian New Year festivities have previously been outlawed in Syria.

== Religion ==
The majority of Assyrians in Syria adhere to both the East and West Syriac Rite. These include the following churches:

=== Catholic Assyrians ===
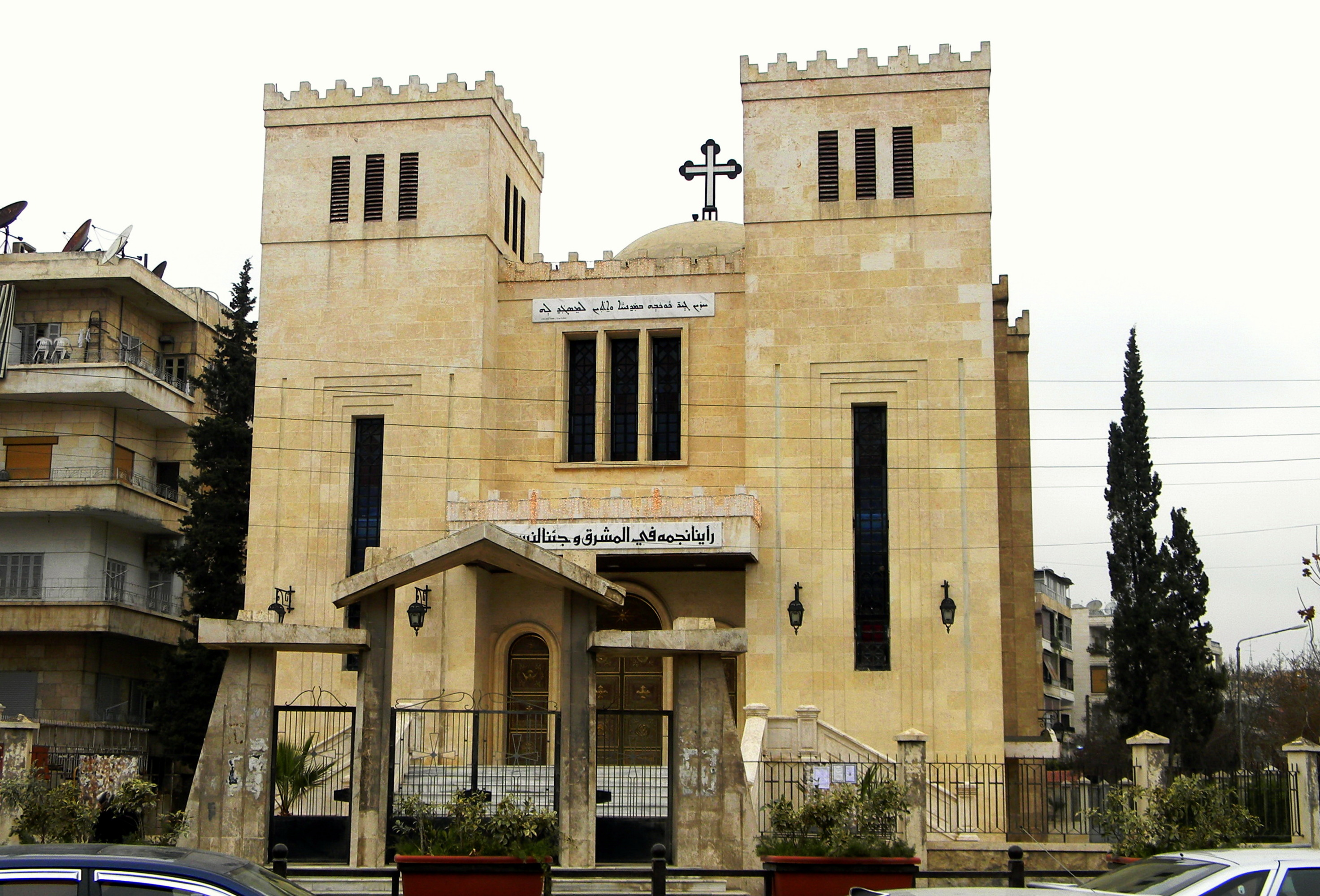
Chaldean Catholic Cathedral of Saint Joseph, Aleppo

==== Chaldean Catholic Church ====
The presence of the Chaldean Catholic Church dates back to the 16th century when Assyrians from Diyarbakir migrated to Aleppo.

The Chaldean Catholic Eparchy of Aleppo, under the tenure of the Bishop of Aleppo, Mar Antony Audo, was established in 1957 and is divided into 14 parishes.

==== Syriac Catholic Church ====
There are four dioceses of the Syriac Catholic Church in Syria including the:

- Metropolitan Syriac Catholic Archeparchy of Damascus
- Metropolitan Syriac Catholic Archeparchy of Homs (vacant since 2013)
- Syriac Catholic Archeparchy of Aleppo
- Syriac Catholic Archeparchy of Hassaké-Nisibi

=== Orthodox Assyrians ===
==== Syriac Orthodox Church ====
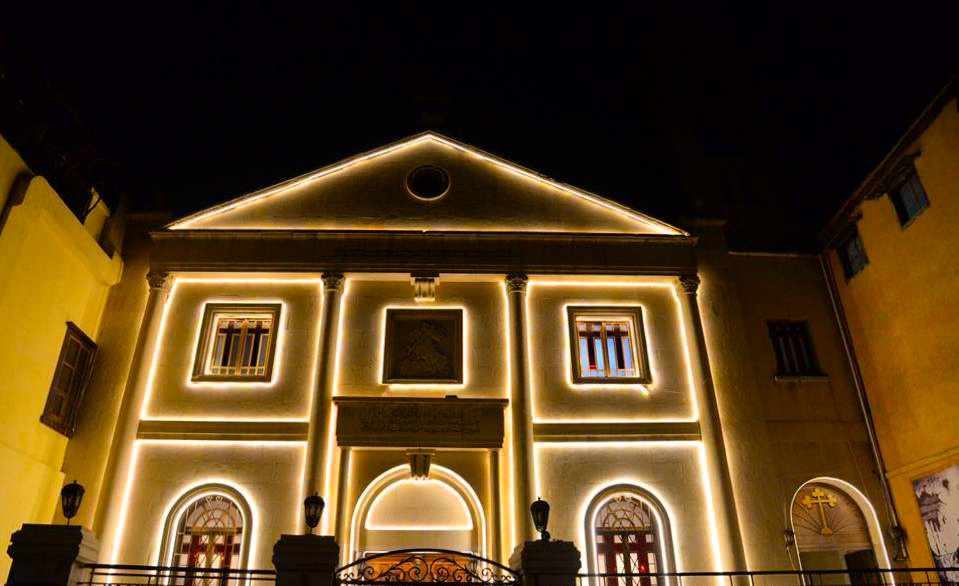
Cathedral of Saint George, Damascus, headquarters of the Syriac Orthodox Patriarchate of Antioch since 1959.

The Syriac Orthodox Church's patriarchal seat is located in Damascus after being transferred in 1959. The Syriac Orthodox Church in Syria is represented by the Patriarch, Ignatius Aphrem II, with three archbishopric's located across Syria in the following:

- Patriarchal Office Director in Damascus Archbishop Timotheus Matta Al-Khoury.
- Archbishopric of Jazirah and Euphrates under the spiritual guidance and direction of acting Archbishop Maurice Amsih.
- Archbishopric of Aleppo under the spiritual guidance and direction of Archbishop Yohanna Ibrahim.
- Archbishopric of Homs & Hama under the spiritual guidance and direction of Archbishop Selwanos Petros AL-Nemeh.
- Patriarchal Vicariate for the Archdiocese of Damascus under the spiritual guidance and direction of Archbishop Timothius Matta AlKhouri.

In the mid-1970s, it was estimated that 82,000 Syriac Orthodox lived in Syria.

== Demographics ==
In 2018 Professor John Shoup stated that the Assyrian population in Syria formed 4% of the country's total population, making it the fourth largest ethnic group in the country.

== Politics ==
Logo of 'Mtakasto', the oldest Assyrian political party in Syria

=== Assyrian Democratic Organization ===
The Assyrian Democratic Organization (ADO), more commonly known as "Mtakasto", was founded in 1957 and serves as the oldest Assyrian political party in Syria. The principles of the party are based around huyodo/khoyada, unity, and gained a foothold amongst western Assyrian youth. Gabriel Moushe Gawrieh, the current leader of the party, was detained by the Syrian government and imprisoned for 2 years, until his release in June 2016.

== Syrian Civil War ==
Assyrians have been caught between different political sides from the onset of the Syrian Civil War with some Assyrian groups allying with the Syrian Government and others with the Kurdish-led Syrian Democratic Forces.

=== Assyrian militias ===
VOA report about Assyrians fighting ISIL in Hassakeh

With the onset of the Syrian Civil War, Assyrians have formed numerous military forces in order to protect their communities. These range from military groups to police forces concentrated in the Al-Hasakah Governorate, mainly in Qamishli and Khabur. These militias include:

==== Gozarto Protection Force ====
Gozarto Protection Force (GPF), or Sootoro, are a light infantry militia formed in 2012 that are aligned to the Syrian Government. The militia is composed mainly of Assyrians, with a smaller number of Armenians in the group. GPF mainly clash with ISIL, although they have also been involved in clashes with Kurdish forces stationed nearby.

==== Syriac Military Council ====
The Syriac Military Council (MFS) are a militia of the Dawronoye ideology that are a component of the Syrian Democratic Forces (SDF) and under the Syriac Union Party. MFS have been involved in numerous offensives alongside the YPG, including some in northern Iraq (Nineveh & Sinjar). The Bethnahrain Women's Protection Forces are the female brigade of the MFS and assume guard roles in the Assyrian communities of northeast Syria.

==== Sutoro ====
Sutoro are the police wing of the Syriac Military Council and have been active in Syria from 2012 onwards. Sutoro police the Assyrian communities of northeast Syria, as well as working in concert with Asayish to safeguard the region.

==== Khabour Guards ====
Khabour Guards, as well as Nattoreh are a militia tied to the Assyrian Democratic Party and are active in the Khabur Valley of Syria. Founded in 2012, Khabour Guards have been involved in SDF campaigns and in 2019, merged with the Syriac Military Council to form the Syriac-Assyrian Military Council.

=== Clashes with Kurdish Forces ===
The main group aligned with the Assad-government are the Sootoro forces stationed in northeast Syria. In early 2016, Sootoro forces set up checkpoints in the Assyrian-controlled districts of Qamishli due to increasing terrorist attacks targeting Assyrians in the city. Members of Asayish, the security-wing of the YPG, approached the checkpoints and demanded they be dismantled. When Sootoro refused, Asayish fired at Sootoro soldiers, causing several casualties on both sides.

=== Persecution by ISIL ===
The Syrian Civil War initially put much strain on Assyrians in Syria. As of November 2014, due to occupation by the ISIL, only 23 Assyrian and Armenian families remain in the city of Raqqa. Christian bibles and holy books have reportedly been burned by ISIL militants.

==== Assyrians kidnapped ====
On 23 February 2015, ISIL abducted 232 Assyrians from villages near Tell Tamer in the Khabur valley. According to US diplomat Alberto M. Fernandez, of the 232 of the Assyrians kidnapped in the ISIL attack on the Assyrian Christian farming villages on the banks of the Khabur River in Northeast Syria, 51 were children and 84 women. "Most of them remain in captivity with one account claiming that ISIL is demanding $22 million (or roughly $100,000 per person) for their release." On 8 October, ISIL released a video showing three of the Assyrian men kidnapped in Khabur being executed. It was reported that 202 of the 232 kidnapped Assyrians were still in captivity, each one with a demanded ransom of $100,000. In early 2016, ISIL freed the remaining 42 hostages in exchange for an undisclosed ransom mediated by the Assyrian Church of the East.

==== Wusta Bombings ====
On 30 December 2015, 16 people were killed and 30 wounded when three blasts struck restaurants in the Assyrian district of Wusta in Qamishli. An IS-linked news agency, Amaq, said the group carried out the bombings. This prompted the Gozarto Protection Forces to set up checkpoints in the district as the Syrian government, nor the Kurdish-led DFNS could guarantee their safety.

== Autonomous Administration of North and East Syria ==
An unofficial flag of Assyrians in the Jazira Region, used by the Syriac Military Council

The decrease of political repression after government withdrawal and the inclusion of Assyrian political and military movements in the Autonomous Administration of North and East Syria has led to greater inclusion of Assyrians in the governance of the region. The Syriac Union Party (SUP), committed to the secular leftist "Dawronoye" ideology, is a part of the governing Movement for a Democratic Society (TEV-DEM) coalition. The Sutoro is an Assyrian police force, working in concert with the general Asayish police force with the mission to police ethnic Assyrian areas and neighbourhoods.

While Syriac was an official language of the Jazira Region from the outset, in August 2016, the Ourhi Centre in the city of Qamishli was started by the Assyrian community, to educate teachers in order to make Syriac-Aramaic an additional language to be taught in public schools, which then started with the 2016/17 academic year. With that academic year, states the region's Education Committee, "three curriculums have replaced the old one, to include teaching in three languages: Kurdish, Arabic and Syriac."

=== Human rights violation claims ===
The region, however, has been accused of closing down 14 Assyrian schools that have refused to adhere to a curriculum produced by the Kurdish-led government. Many Assyrians have rejected the new curriculum, stating that the curriculum is not recognized or accredited elsewhere, while the Syrian government-led curriculum is. There is also opposition by Assyrians against the curriculum produced by the region's administration, which some Assyrian leaders say has been an attempt to impose a Kurdish nationalist curriculum across the region.

In April 2015, David Jendo, the leader of the Khabur Guards, was assassinated after being kidnapped alongside fellow commander, Elias Nasser. Both men were blindfolded and driven to a remote location, supposedly to have an urgent meeting with YPG leadership. Jendo and Nasser were then shot and David Jendo immediately died, while Elias Nasser was severely wounded. Jendo had publicly spoken against the YPG looting Assyrian homes in 2015. The attackers were allegedly arrested and tried in a regional court, resulting in 20 years prison for the two killers, 4 and 1 years respectively for the other two attackers.

In November 2015, sixteen Assyrian and Armenian civic and church organizations issued a joint statement protesting Kurdish expropriation of private property. The statement accuses the PYD of human rights violations, expropriation of private property, illegal military conscription and interference in church school curricula.

Kurds in Syria have been accused of silencing Assyrian critics of their administration, usually using Assyrian proxy forces such as Sutoro to intimidate these critics. On September 30, 2018, prominent Assyrian writer Souleman Yousph was arrested without being informed of charges, in what is alleged to be in response to an article published by Mr. Yousph in which he criticized the de facto Kurdish authorities for closing Assyrian schools, as well as the assault on Issa Rashid, a fellow Assyrian writer. One day after his arrest, Sutoro announced a statement saying that "Action had to be taken against those spreading lies, that democracy has rules and limitations, and that defamation is punishable by law in Western countries".

== See also ==
- List of Assyrian settlements
- Assyria
- Assyrian people
- Assyrian continuity
- Assyrian homeland
- Assyrian Democratic Organization
- Syriac Union Party (Syria)
- Syriac Military Council
- Sutoro
- Assyrian diaspora

== Sources ==
- Hooglund, Eric (2008). "The Society and Its Environment" (PDF). In Curtis, Glenn E.; Hooglund, Eric (eds.). Iran: A Country Study. Area Handbook Series. United States Library of Congress, Federal Research Division (5th ed.). Washington, D.C.: United States Government Printing Office. pp. 81–142. ISBN 978-0-8444-1187-3.
- Joseph, John (1983). Muslim-Christian Relations and Inter-Christian Rivalries in the Middle East: The Case of the Jacobites in an Age of Transition. SUNY Press. ISBN 978-0-87395-600-0.
- Parry, Ken (2010). The Blackwell Companion to Eastern Christianity. John Wiley & Sons. ISBN 978-1-4443-3361-9.
