= Hasakah District =

Hasakah District منطقة الحسكة Navçeya Hesekê
- District
- Location of Hasakah District within Hasakah Governorate

- Location in Syria
- Coordinates (Hasakah): 36.5°N 40.75°E
- Country: Syria
- Governorate: Hasakah
- Seat: Hasakah
- Subdistricts: 4 nawāḥī

Area
  - Total: 5,808.42 km^{2} (2,242.64 sq mi)

Population (2004)
  - Total: 356,189
  - Density: 61.3229/km^{2} (158.826/sq mi)
- Geocode: SY0800

Hasakah District (Arabic: منطقة الحسكة, romanized: manṭiqat al-Ḥasaka; Kurdish: Navçeya Hesekê) is a district of Hasakah Governorate in northeastern Syria. The administrative centre for the district is the city of Hasakah. At the 2004 census, the district had a population of 356,189.

== Demographics ==
In 1939, French mandate authorities reported the following population numbers for the different ethnic and religious groups in al-Hasakah area.

District	Arab	Kurd	Christian	Armenian	Assyrian
City centre	7133	360	5700	500	
Tel Tamer					8767
Ras al-Ayn	2283	1025	2263		
Shaddadi	2610		6		
Tel Brak	4509	905		200	

== Subdistricts ==
The district of al-Hasakah is divided into four subdistricts or nawāḥī (population as of 2004):

Subdistricts of al-Hasakah District
PCode	Name	Area	Population	Villages	Seat
SY080000	Hasakah Subdistrict	2,509.56 km^{2}	251,570	108	al-Hasakah
SY080001	Tell Tamer Subdistrict	1,111.89 km^{2}	50,982	13	Tell Tamer
SY080004	Bir al-Helou al-Wardiya Subdistrict	915.05 km^{2}	38,833	72	Bir al-Helou
SY080006	al-Hawl Subdistrict	1,271.92 km^{2}	14,804	22	al-Hawl
