= Battle of Hasakah (2015) =

Battle between ISIL and Syrian Armed Forces

Coordinates: 36.4833°N 40.7500°E

- Part of the Syrian Civil War, the Rojava–Islamist conflict, and the American-led intervention in Syria
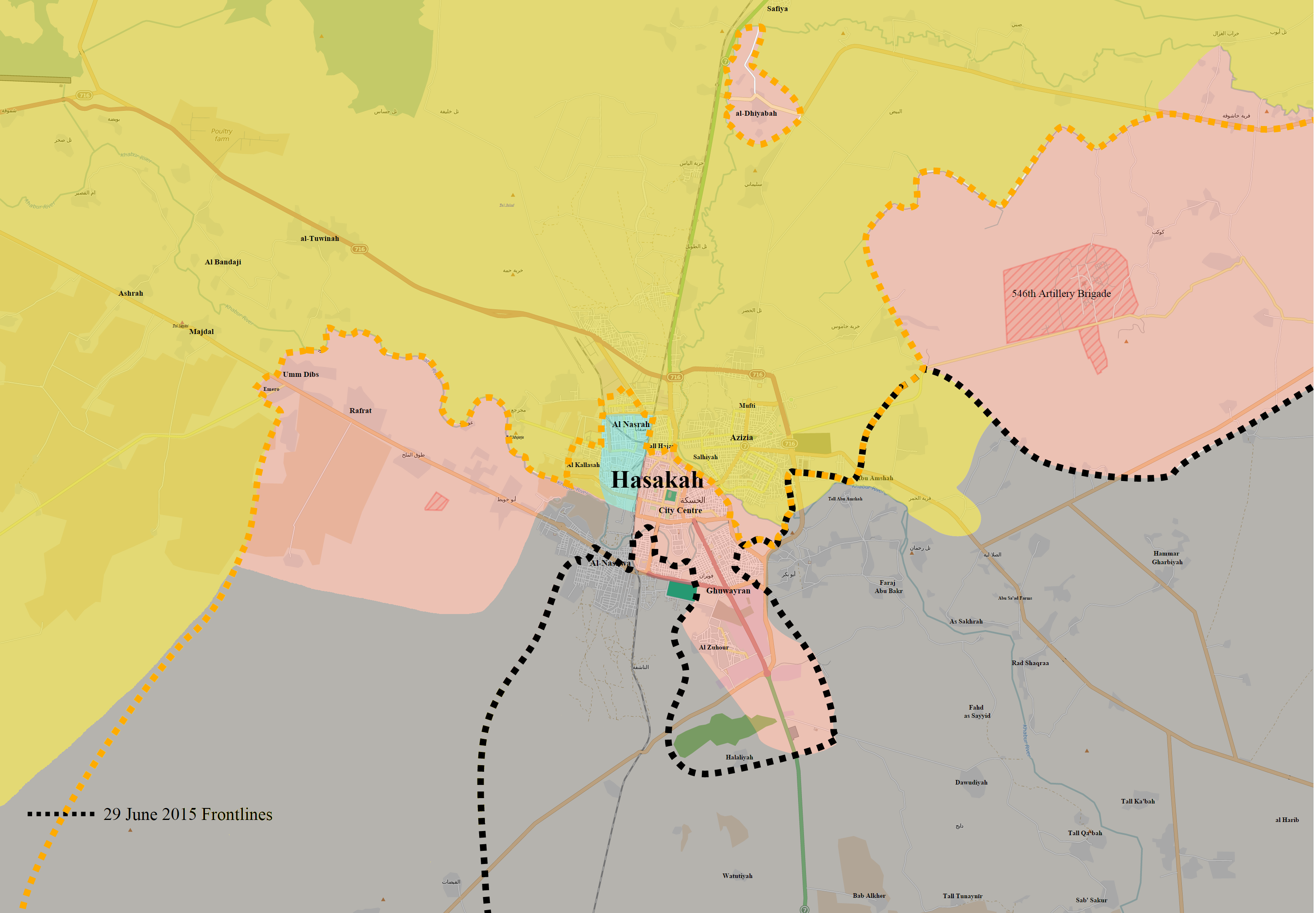
- The situation in Hasakah city, on 3 July 2015 Controlled by Syrian Government Controlled by YPG Controlled by MFS Controlled by ISIL
Date	23 June – 1 August 2015 (1 month, 1 week and 2 days)
Location	Hasakah, Syria
Result	Decisive Syrian Army & YPG/J victory
Territorial changes	ISIL initially captured four districts and areas in three others, as well as multiple villages southwest of Al-Hasakah; Hasakah city is fully cleared of ISIL fighters on 1 August, with the SAA, YPG/J, and Sutoro/MFS left in control of the city; The YPG is left in control of 75% of the city, while the Syrian Army controls 25%

Belligerents
Syrian Kurdistan; Syriac Union Party; Airstrikes: CJTF–OIR (Syria) Syrian Arab Republic: Syrian Armed Forces; Syrian Arab Air Force; Syrian Republican Guard	Islamic State

Commanders and leaders
Gen. Commander Sipan Hemo; Botan Ahmed; Ishow Gowriye (Syria) Maj. Gen. Issam Zahreddine	(Islamic State) Abu Osama al-Iraqi † (Governor of al-Barakah Province)

Units involved
YPG; YPJ; Syriac Military Council (MFS); Al-Sanadid Forces; Asayish; HPC Syrian Army: 3rd Armoured Division; 123rd Tank Brigade; 4th Armoured Division; 154th Artillery Brigade; 5th Syrian Border Guard Brigade; 104th Republican Guard Airborne Brigade (reinforcements); National Defence Force; Ba'ath Brigades Sootoro	(Islamic State) Military of ISIL: al-Barakah Province; "Army of the Caliphate" elite units; Unit 335

Strength
1,000–1,200 YPG fighters (estimated); 400 Syrian Republican Guard soldiers (reinforcements)	4,500+ fighters

Casualties and losses
21 YPG fighters killed 125 Syrian Gov. soldiers killed and 100 wounded	300+ killed (Al Rai claim); 312 killed (SOHR claim); 386 killed (YPG claim); 444+ killed (Syrian Army claim)
- 120,000+ civilians displaced

The 2015 Battle of Hasakah started as an offensive launched in Hasakah Governorate during the Syrian Civil War, in which the Islamic State (IS) attempted to capture the city of Hasakah, which was divided into two areas held separately by the Syrian Armed Forces and the Kurdish People's Defense Units (YPG). On 17 July, YPG-led forces captured all of the roads and villages surrounding Hasakah, fully besieging the ISIL militants remaining inside of the city. On 28 July, YPG forces and the Syrian Army expelled ISIL from most of Hasakah city, with two ISIL pockets persisting near the Al-Zuhour District and the southern entrance of the city. On 1 August, the city was fully cleared of ISIL fighters.

== Background ==
On 30 May 2015, after ISIL forces suffered a collapse in the western Hasakah province, they launched an offensive on the Syrian government-held portion of Hasakah city. Although the Kurdish YPG initially stayed out of the conflict, they eventually joined the conflict on 5 June, after ISIL reached the southern gate of the city, after a decision that the YPG would be recognized as a primary combatant force in the city. On 8 June 2015, ISIL was pushed back from Hasakah city, and Syrian Army forces were able to establish a 12 kilometer (7.46 mi) buffer zone around the southern portion of Hasakah city.

== The battle ==
=== ISIL offensive assault ===
On 23 June, three or four ISIL suicide bombers targeted a Syrian Army security compound, a military checkpoint near a children's hospital, and a YPG police station in the Kurdish-held part of the city. Ten Syrian government soldiers were killed in the attacks. Two days later, ISIL began an assault on the Syrian government-held parts of the city, after detonating an VBIED near a checkpoint at the southern entrance, seizing the al-Nashwa and al-Shari'ah neighborhoods, the children's hospital, and the education college. Later, the Syrian Army brought in reinforcements in an attempt to counter the offensive, while ISIL detonated a second suicide car bomb.

On 26 June, ISIL managed to enter the southeastern parts of the city, while at least 20 Syrian Army soldiers were killed after ISIL detonated two VBIEDs at the criminal security building, resulting in the destruction of large parts of it. On the same day, ISIL forces launched an assault on Syrian government-held areas to the east of the Kurdish held Abd al-Aziz Mountains, capturing territory from the village of Abyad to the south of Al-Harmalah, west of Hasakah city.

On 27 June, the YPG was engaged in the battle for Hasakah city, as it supported local Syrian government forces near al-Villat al-Homr, on the outskirts of the Ghuweran neighborhood. Despite Republican Guard reinforcements, ISIL advanced further into the city on that day. The Syrian Army launched a counterattack, after 400 Republican Guard soldiers from Deir Ezzor were deployed to Hasakah, while the Asayish declared a curfew over the city. The Syrian Army reportedly recaptured the Al-Liliyah district and the eastern corridor of the Al-Nishwa District.

On 28 June, ISIL made new gains, capturing the Ghuweran stadium, and the Aziziya and Al-Ghazal Districts. On the following day, Syrian government forces advanced towards the al-Nashwa District, after calling in new reinforcements, and reportedly recaptured the Ghuweran District later on that day. At least 12 Syrian Army soldiers were killed by three suicide bombers, while 9 ISIL militants were killed. The Syrian Kurdish People's Protection Units (YPG) militia claimed ISIS had fired "makeshift chemical projectiles" containing poison gas at areas in the city of Hasakah, and at YPG positions south of the town of Tel Brak to the northeast of Hasakah city.

On 29 June, Syrian state TV claimed that Syrian government troops had recaptured the al-Nashwa district, while the SOHR confirmed they managed to seize parts of al-Nashwa but that fighting around the area continued. A Damascus security source also confirmed fighting continued in the district. Later on that day, the pro-Syrian government Al Masdar News reported that the Syrian Army recaptured the Ghuweran Stadium.

=== Syrian Army/YPG counterattack ===
Over the next two days, the Syrian Army managed to recapture most of the areas seized by the ISIL militants. In addition, the YPG reportedly expelled ISIL from al-Aziziyah and took control of the neighbourhood and the nearby villages of Maruf and Hamra.

On 1 July, the Syrian Army brought in new reinforcements, while two VBIEDs were detonated inside the city, as ISIL renewed its attack on the Ghuweran district. The next day, ISIL regained ground in a city neighborhood.

On 3 July, 11 Syrian Army soldiers were killed and wounded by an ISIL suicide bomber in the city. On the same day, ISIL advanced to the Khabur River in southwestern Hasakah city, reaching the Kurdish and Assyrian-held part of northern Hasakah. By then, ISIL had deployed over 4,500 militants into Hasakah city.

By 5 July, YPG forces stationed to the east of the Abd al-Aziz Mountains launched an offensive eastward, capturing multiple villages that ISIL had captured from Syrian Army forces, in an attempt to sever an ISIL supply line to Hasakah city. The US-led Coalition also conducted two airstrikes near the highway, in support of the YPG advance.

On 8 July, the Syrian Army units reportedly established full control over the al-Lailiyeh neighborhood in Hasaka city. On 10 July, ISIL captured the Faculty of Economics, on the southern outskirts of the city, but part of it was recaptured by the Syrian Army later in the day. The Syrian Army also reportedly captured the southeastern part of the Al-Nishwa District.

On 10 July, ISIL militants captured the military housing to the east of the Al-Zuhour neighborhood, fully besieging the Syrian Army forces in the juvenile prison and the power plant to the south of Hasakah city. Around the same time, YPG forces to the south of Al-Harmalah had advanced eastward to the Abyad Bridge, capturing it, and severing a section of an ISIL supply route, to the south of Hasakah's Al-Nishwa District.

On 13 July, ISIL captured the Al-Ahdath Prison, in the southern countryside of the city, after besieging it for one week. 23 NDF and SAA soldiers were killed and 11 missing during a breakout attempt, while 37 SAA soldiers managed to reach Syrian government lines.

On 14 July, the Syrian Army announced it had concluded the first phase of military operations inside the provincial capital of Hasakah, and had now entered the second phase. The first phase consisted of forestalling ISIL's progress in Hasakah city. The goal of the second phase was to recapture the west district of the Al-Nishwa Quarter, along with the remaining territory in the Al-Zuhour Quarter under ISIL's control (i.e. the Panorama Roundabout). The goal of the third and final phase was to recapture the villages surrounding Hasakah City, in order to build another buffer zone to prevent the encroaching combatants of ISIL from re-entering.

=== ISIL surrounded and expelled ===
On 17 July, YPG captured the Al-Ahdath Prison as well as a power plant, from ISIL, in an action that effectively encircled the 1,200 remaining ISIL combatants in the city. YPG fighters had also taken control of the villages formerly controlled by the Syrian Army to the west of Hasakah city, leaving the Syrian Army in control of only central Hasakah city. This left ISIL fully besieged in Hasakah city in 2 separate pockets, in the Nashwa, Al-Zuhour, and Abu Bakr neighborhoods, in the south and the southeast of Hasakah city. By 20 July, the Syrian Army also expelled ISIL fighters from the Ghuweran district.

On 21 July, SOHR reported that 13 ISIL fighters had been killed in SAAF airstrikes. Simultaneously, YPG reportedly advanced, capturing Al-Watwatiyah and the rural area north of Tal Tanaynir as well as some farms north of Bab Al-Khayr. NDF and Gozarto also gained some territory, capturing three building blocks in the Al-Shari'ah neighborhood. ISIL forces were reportedly now fully besieged inside Hasakah.

By 23 July, Kurdish forces and their Syriac allies were largely in control of the city, having recaptured their own areas, as well as areas previously held by the Syrian Government, from ISIL, as well as controlling most of the access points into the city. That day, YPG and allies advanced towards al-Melbiyyeh regiment, as well as taking parts of Western al-Nashweh neighborhood. Meanwhile, government troops also advanced in the Ghwyran neighborhood. At the end of the day, ISIL retreated towards the Shar'iah neighborhood, while the YPG and Syrian government forces made new gains in the city. On 24 July, it was also reported that the ISIL leadership in Al-Shaddadi had abandoned a plan to rescue the besieged ISIL forces in Hasakah city, after two vehicle bomb attacks were stopped by the YPG at Al-Dawudiyah and Al-Salaliah.

By 25 July, Kurdish and allied forces had seized the western al-Nashweh neighborhood and reached the outskirts of Shar'iah neighborhood, while also reaching Filastin Street in the city center. Meanwhile, Syrian government forces advanced around the Gweiran Sport City. On 26 July, the SOHR reported that Syrian government forces had managed to isolate the ISIL units in the southern Hasakah city, separating the contingents battling the YPG in western al-Neshwa from the units fighting Syrian government forces in the al-Zuhour neighborhood, in the southern part of Hasakah city. Hundreds of civilian refugees who had previously fled the battle were now reportedly beginning to return to their homes. ISIL control of the city was reduced to 10%, with Syrian government forces controlling 20%, and the Kurdish forces and their allies now expanding their control to most of the city, with them controlling the remaining 70%. Later on that same day, the SOHR reported that ISIL was close to defeat in Hasakah city, with their presence reduced to a pocket of resistance in the neighborhood of al-Zuhour, in southern Hasakah city. The recent days of conflict had left at least 271 ISIL fighters dead. On July 28, it was reported that ISIL had finally been defeated after the YPG and government forces managed to seize al-Zuhour, which killed 31 ISIL fighters. A few remaining ISIL militants were said to be trapped inside the west district of the Al-Nishwa Quarter, with all available supply lines breached and nowhere to escape. Later on 28 July, the Al-Zuhour District was nearly cleared by YPG and Syrian Army forces, resulting in the remaining ISIL militants being pushed to the southern outskirts of the city.

On 29 July, the US-led Coalition conducted two airstrikes on ISIL positions near Hasakah city.

On 30 July, there were still two ISIL pockets at the southern entrance of the city and in the Al-Zuhour District. The remaining ISIL militants tried to entrench themselves inside buildings near the Youth Housing Camp, but were subjected to further assaults, with 20 fighters killed by YPG forces. The remaining ISIL fighters were thus left with an ultimatum to "surrender or die". Meanwhile, five soldiers were killed and eight others wounded after ISIL launched an attack on the southern part of Hasakah city. By 31 July, Syrian government forces had made further advances against ISIL. By the next day, the number of killed ISIL fighters since 28 July had reached 25.

Clashes continued in the southern suburbs until 1 August, and later on that day, the city was reportedly secured from ISIL, after their last stronghold in the al-Zuhor district was captured by SAA/YPG forces. On the same day, the YPG and the SAA released press statements stating that they had fully secured the city from ISIL. The YPG also stated that the nearest ISIL positions to Hasakah city had been pushed back to a distance of 4 kilometres (2.49 mi) from the city suburbs.

== Aftermath ==
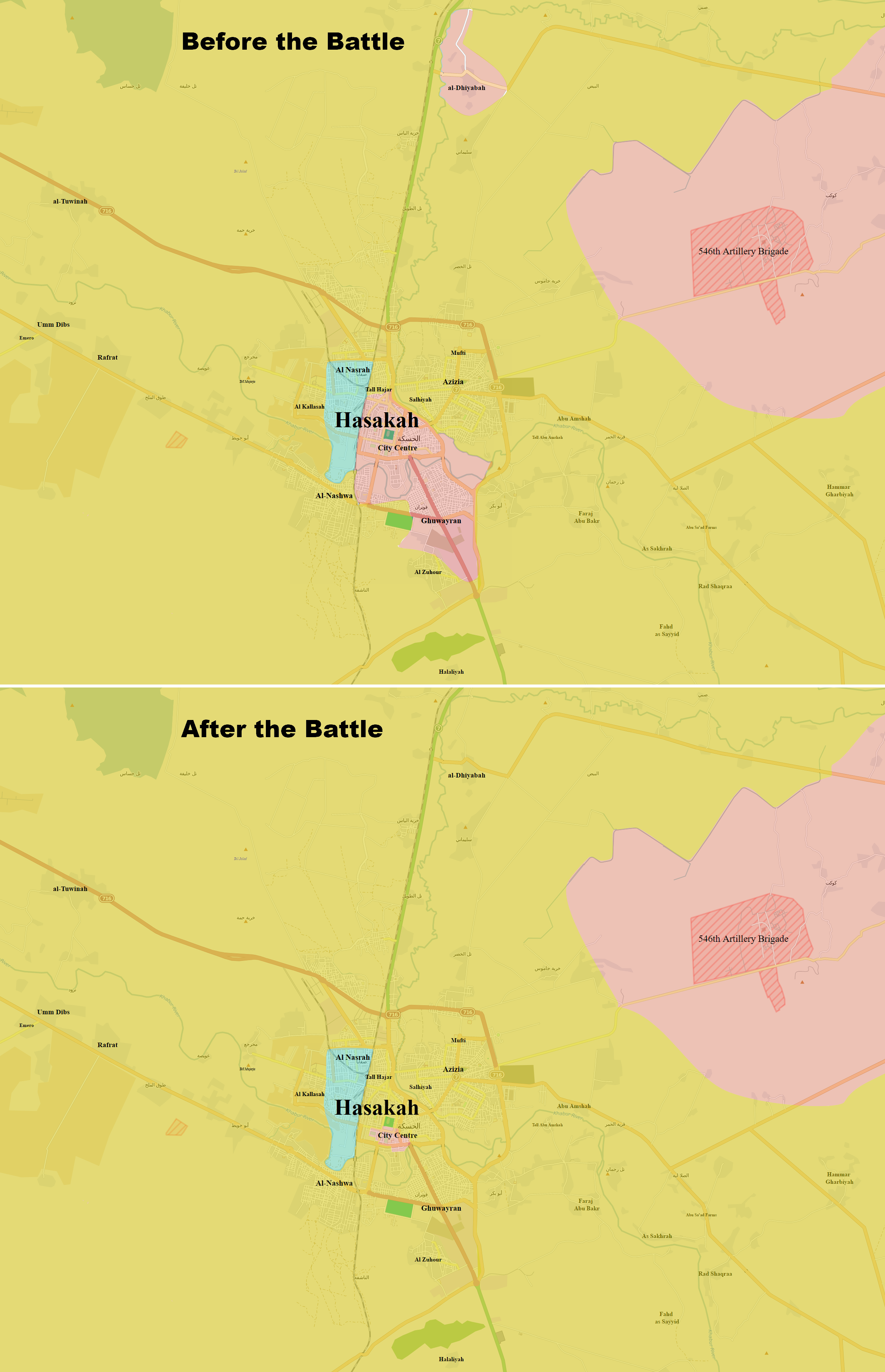
The situation after the Battle of Hasakah (2015) on top, and the results of the Battle of Hasakah (2016) on the bottom

The battle against ISIL left several districts of Hasakah city in ruins, due to the massive bombing and shelling.

On 3 August, Syrian government sources confirmed that the city had been fully cleared of ISIL fighters. The sources also stated that the Syrian government and the YPG had now begun negotiations for redistributing contested territories seized by either side during the battle. Thus far, negotiations had resulted in the Syrian government handing control of a school over to the YPG. On the night of 3 August, YPG-led forces captured farmland from ISIL near the village of Rajman, to the southeast of Hasakah city, in a clearing operation.

On 11 August, the US-led Coalition conducted an airstrike on a village east of Hasakah city, blowing up a building that ISIL was using for a meeting, which killed over 50 ISIL militants. On 12 August, ISIL reportedly publicly shot and executed more than 90 of its own members as punishment for escaping the battlefield. ISIL claimed that the fighters' desertion was the main cause of ISIL's loss at the Battle of Hasakah. It was reported on 16 August that ISIL had executed four more of its own fighters, for allegedly collaborating with the CJTF–OIR Coalition.

== See also ==
- Sinjar massacre
- Northern Iraq offensive (August 2014)
- December 2014 Sinjar offensive
- November 2015 Sinjar offensive
- Siege of Kobanî
- Battle of Sarrin (March–April 2015)
- Eastern Hasakah offensive (February–March 2015)
- Qalamoun offensive (May–June 2015)
- Palmyra offensive (May 2015)
- Western Hasakah offensive (May 2015)
- Battle of Sarrin (June–July 2015)
- 2015 Ramadan attacks
  - Kobanî massacre
- Al-Hawl offensive
- Tishrin Dam offensive
- Al-Shaddadi offensive (2016)
- Battle of Qamishli (April 2016)
- Battle of Hasakah (2016)
- Rojava
- Rojava Revolution
- Military intervention against ISIL
- List of wars and battles involving ISIL
- Timeline of ISIL related events
