= Hasakah city offensive =

2015 battle between ISIL and Syria

- Part of the American-led intervention in Syria, the Syrian Civil War, and the Syrian Kurdish–Islamist conflict (2013–present)
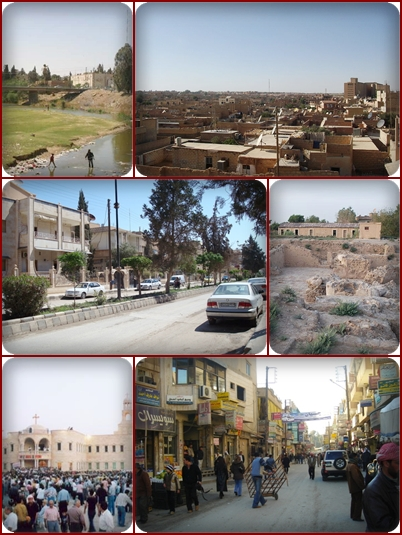
- Collage of places in Hasakah city
Date	30 May – 8 June 2015 (1 week and 2 days)
Location	Hasakah, Syria 36.4833°N 40.7500°E
Result	Syrian Army/YPG victory: Syrian Army recaptures two villages, al-Ahdath prison and a power plant south of the city

Belligerents
(Syria) Syrian Arab Republic Syrian Kurdistan; Syriac Union Party; Supported by: CJTF–OIR	Islamic State

Units involved
Syrian Arab Armed Forces (Ba'athist Syria); Syrian Army; 3rd Armoured Division; 123rd Tank Brigade; 4th Armoured Division; 154th Artillery Brigade; 5th Syrian Border Guard Brigade; National Defence Force; Ba'ath Brigades Sootoro; Gozarto Protection Forces YPG Syriac Military Council (MFS)	(Islamic State) Military of ISIL: al-Barakah Province

Casualties and losses
71 Syrian soldiers and 11 YPG fighters killed	114 ISIL militants killed (11 suicide bombers), 23 of them by YPG
- 25 civilians killed 4,000+ civilians fled

The Hasakah city offensive was launched during the Syrian Civil War by the Islamic State (IS) against the city of Hasakah, which was held by both the Syrian Armed Forces and the Kurdish YPG.

== Background ==
In May 2015, the Kurdish YPG, backed by the Assyrian Syriac Military Council, allied Arab tribal fighters, and Free Syrian Army fighters, launched a large-scale offensive in the western Hasakah Governorate, capturing over 4,000 square kilometres (1,544.41 sq mi) of land and over 230 villages from ISIS.

== The offensive ==
On 30 May, ISIL launched an offensive towards the Syrian government-controlled part of Hasakah, and advanced in the city's outskirts after two suicide bombers targeted Syrian Army positions, killing and wounding 50 soldiers. The offensive originated from the ISIL-held town of Al-Shaddadah, south of Hasakah, and was the jihadist organizations's third assault on the city in 2015.

On 31 May, the Syrian Arab Air Force bombed Al-Shaddadah, killing 43 ISIL militants and family members, as well as 22 civilians. The strikes targeted a souq market. The same day, two ISIL suicide bombers attacked military positions near Hasakah. One of them drove a tanker, killing nine soldiers.

On 1 June, ISIL launched its second attack on Hasakah by firing a barrage of mortar shells and rockets toward the city center, followed by a ground assault on the villages of Al-Dawoudiyah and Rad Shaqra. Eventually, the militants breached Syrian Army fortifications at the Al-Ahdath Central Prison, near Al-Dawoudiyah, capturing the southeastern sector of the facility. After Syrian government reinforcements arrived, the Syrian Army was reportedly able to recapture areas of the prison.

On the morning of 2 June, ISIL took control of the southern perimeter of Al-Dawoudiyah. Meanwhile, Syrian government forces reportedly expelled ISIL fighters from Rad Shaqra. The next day, it was reported a newly formed pro-Syrian government Assyrian militia, called the Gozarto Protection Forces, had arrived from Qamishli to reinforce Syrian government troops.

On 4 June, the Syrian government sent more reinforcements to Hasakah. By this point, ISIL was in control of the Panorama checkpoint, al-Ahdath prison, three villages, including Al-Dawoudiyah, and the city's electricity company, bringing the jihadists within less than 500 meters of Hasakah. The advances came after an ISIL assault using six suicide bombers, including five against the prison. A total of 11 suicide bombers hit Syrian government positions since the start of the offensive.

On 5 June, the Kurdish YPG and Syriac SMC militias joined Syrian government troops at their security center on Mount Kawkab, in an attempt to prevent any possible ISIL attacks on the city. The next day, ISIL used howitzer artillery against Syrian Army positions near Mount Kawkab.

On 6 June, Syrian government forces launched a counterattack and recaptured the Panorama checkpoint, the prison, and the Hasakah Power Plant. That night, after not getting involved since the start of the offensive, the YPG started fighting ISIL, on the western outskirts of the northern part of the city that they control. Kurdish involvement began after they were criticised by city figures for not defending Hasakah, and were subsequently recognised as "a primary combat force in the city" after several meetings. By the next day, the Syrian Army had recaptured Al-Dawoudiyah and Abyad. Soon afterwards, the Syrian Army repelled a new ISIL attack on the prison and power plant that lasted most of the morning and into the afternoon. Later, the Syrian Army continued its counterattack, and recaptured the villages of Al-Watwatiyah and Al-Mishtal Al-Zura’yy, pushing ISIL back up to 2 kilometers from the city. Clashes continued near the prison and the electricity company, as the Syrian Arab Air Force bombed ISIL positions along the Hasakah-Al-Shaddadah road, and in Al-Shaddadah itself.

On 8 June, the Syrian Army continued its counterattack and reportedly recaptured the village of Aliyah, thus creating a 12 kilometer buffer zone around Hasakah city. The same day, the Syrian Army was declared "triumphant" in their defense of the city by the pro-Syrian government Al-Masdar News.

== Aftermath ==
On 23 June, ISIL began a new offensive on Syrian government-held parts of the city, seizing southwestern neighborhoods after former pro-Syrian government National Defence Force militias in the area allegedly switched allegiance to ISIL. The assault was one of many attacks carried out by ISIL during Ramadan of 2015.

== See also ==
- Sinjar massacre
- Northern Iraq offensive (August 2014)
- December 2014 Sinjar offensive
- November 2015 Sinjar offensive
- Siege of Kobanî
- Battle of Sarrin (March–April 2015)
- Battle of Sarrin (June–July 2015)
- Eastern Hasakah offensive
- Qalamoun offensive (May 2015)
- Palmyra offensive (2015)
- 2015 Ramadan attacks
  - Kobanî massacre
- Rojava
- Military intervention against ISIL
- List of wars and battles involving ISIL
- Timeline of ISIL related events
