= Battle of Sarrin (March–April 2015) =

Military operation

- Part of the Syrian Civil War, Syrian Kurdish–Islamist conflict (2013–present), and the American-led intervention in Syria
| Date | 17 March – 27 April 2015 (1 month, 1 week and 3 days) |
| Location | Sarrin, Ayn al-Arab District, Syria 36.5875°N 38.299722°E |
| Result | Indecisive: An ISIL counterattack repels the initial YPG-led offensive on 28 March 2015; YPG-led forces enter Sarrin on 25 April 2015, but are stalled; YPG-led forces launch a new offensive on Sarrin in June 2015 |

Belligerents
| Autonomous Administration of North and East Syria: YPG; YPJ; Free Syrian Army Supported by: CJTF–OIR (Kurdistan Region) Peshmerga | Islamic State |

Commanders and leaders
| (Democratic Autonomous Administration of North and East Syria) Salih Muslim Muhammad (United States) Barack Obama (Kurdistan Region) Masoud Barzani | Abu Ali al-Anbari (Deputy, Syria); Abu Omar al-Shishani (Field commander) |

Units involved
| Euphrates Volcano: YPG; YPJ; (Syria) Dawn of Freedom Brigades; (Syria) Liwa Thuwwar al-Raqqa; (Syria) Al-Qassas Army; (Syria) Jarabulus Brigade; (Kurdistan Region) Peshmerga (United States) 9th Bomb Squadron | ISIL Armed Forces: Wilayat Halab |

Strength
| Unknown | 300–410+ fighters |

Casualties and losses
| Unknown | 24+ militants killed |
- Location within Syria

The Battle of Sarrin (March–April 2015) refers to a military operation during 2015 in the northeastern Aleppo Governorate, during the Syrian Civil War, conducted by Kurdish YPG and allied forces against the Islamic State in the town of Sarrin, in an effort to capture the town and the surrounding region.

== Background ==
In early March 2014, ISIL surrounded the Kobanî Canton and launched an offensive on its southern villages, capturing the town of Sarrin.

On 2 July 2014, the city of Kobanî and its border villages came under attack from fighters of the Islamic State (IS). However, ISIL forces were largely repelled from the remainder of the Kobanî Canton.

On 13 September 2014, ISIL launched a massive offensive to take the Kobanî Canton and the city of Kobanî, with at least 4,000 fighters, During the advance, ISIL forces captured the villages of Robey and Tall Ghazal, and the nearby grain silos. pushing into the villages at the western and eastern borders of the Canton. On 17 September 2014, following the capture of a strategic bridge over the Euphrates on 16 September, In response to the growing crisis, the US-led Coalition began conducting airstrikes in and around Kobanî on 26 September, continuing for five days, until 2 October, during which the US performed no strikes on that day, before reportedly carried out further strikes late on 3 October.

By early October 2014, most of the Kobanî Canton had fallen under ISIL control, with the city of Kobanî itself besieged, causing at least 90% of the Kurdish inhabitants in the region to flee to Turkey. By mid-October 2014, at least 9,000 militants had been dispatched to capture Kobanî, and at least 400,000 Kurdish civilians had fled to Turkey. In late October 2014, Turkey allowed some Free Syrian Army and Peshmerga reinforcements to cross over into Kobanî, allowing the Kurdish defenders to counter the ISIL advance. By mid-November 2014, the YPG and other defenders had managed to make some reversals in Kobanî city.

On 19 January 2015, the YPG-led forces captured the strategic Mistanour Hill to the southeast of Kobanî city, allowing the Kurdish forces to turn the tide of the battle. During the next week, the YPG-led forces gradually advanced, before fully expelling ISIL from Kobanî city on 27 January 2015. ISIL admitted defeat in the city three days later, but vowed to return. At that time, ISIL redeployed much of its initial invasion force to other "more important fronts".

After retaking Kobanî city, the YPG and FSA launched an offensive to retake the rest of the Kobanî Canton. Consequently, ISIL dispatched reinforcements to the region, to prevent the Kurdish-led forces from reaching the ISIL-held territory in the northern Aleppo Governorate, and to prevent them from reaching the ISIL capital of Raqqa.

On 10 February 2015, the YPG built on their recent gains and launched an assault on Sarrin from the northwest. Despite being stalled for nearly 2 weeks, the Kurdish forces nearly reached the western outskirts of the town of Sarrin in late February 2015. However, on 27 February, an ISIL counter-attack drove the YPG away from Sarrin, back to Qara Qozak, just beyond the M5 Highway. Despite this setback, YPG-led forces slowly continued advancing in other parts of the canton, capturing Qara Qozak on 15 March, recapturing most of the territory lost to ISIL during their September 2014 offensive, with the exception of three villages in the southern part of the Canton near Jill, and a few dozen villages captured by ISIL in the eastern Kobanî Canton and the northwestern Raqqa Governorate.

== The assault ==
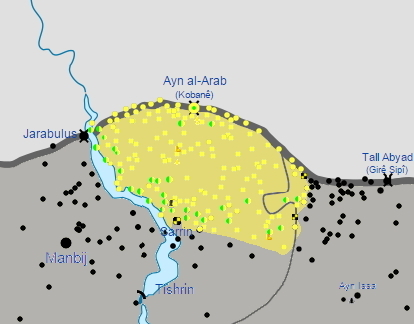
The situation after the end of ISIL's siege of the Kobanî Canton, on 29 April 2015. Most of ISIL's advances since September 2014 had been reversed, and YPG-led forces were battling for control of Sarrin. Controlled by Kurdish forces Controlled by the Syrian opposition Controlled by the Islamic State

=== Initial advance and ISIL counterattack ===
Between 17 and 19 March, the YPG seized a hill overlooking Sarrin, the last remaining ISIL stronghold in the southern part of the Kobanî Canton. ISIL gathered reinforcements and massed its forces near Sarrin, to prevent Kurdish and allied forces from reaching the town, while the US-led Coalition conducted numerous airstrikes in the area. The clashes on 18 March resulted in the deaths of at least 27 ISIL militants.

On 20 March, the YPG and the allied Euphrates Volcano, backed by Coalition air support, launched an assault towards Sarrin, which led to hit-and-run fighting until 28 March.

On 21 March, YPG and FSA forces completely besieged the Sarrin Grain Silo. A total of 71 ISIL militants and 1 FSA fighter were killed during the clashes and Coalition strikes. On the night between 22 and 23 March, ISIL dispatched reinforcements to Sarrin, across the Tishrin Dam, which the Coalition did not target, due to the risks that destroying the dam would pose to those living downstream.

On 25 March, ISIL forces attacked the village of Qara Qozak by boat, but the attack was repelled by the YPG and airstrikes struck the gathered ISIL forces on the other side of the river. The clashes left at least 71 ISIL militants and 4 YPG fighters dead. Two days later, fighting in the southern villages of Sebti and Khani left three ISIL militants dead.

On 28 March, ISIL launched a counter-attack and managed to break through the Kurd's M4 highway defensive line and reach ISIL fighters at the Grain Silos, and at the Lafarge Cement Plant, near the southeastern boundary of the Kobanî Canton, where the militants had been besieged for almost two weeks. On the next day, YPG fighters began shelling ISIL positions in Sarrin.

In early April, ISIL continued forcing Kurdish forces back from the outskirts of Sarrin, to the north and the northwest towards Qara Qozak. Still, the YPG continued to hold the higher ground in the area. Eventually, the ISIL advance cut the M4 highway between Dar Al-Kharab and Mitras and allowed the jihadists to reinforce their positions at the Sarrin Grain Silos. By 9 April, ISIL forces, after receiving more reinforcements, broke across the M4 highway near Mitras and the Grain Silos, and at Nur Ali and Hamdoun, to the east.

=== Besieging Sarrin ===
In mid-April, a YPG counter-offensive, aided by US-led Coalition airstrikes, allowed the YPG-led forces to advance towards Sarrin again. On 13 April 2015, the YPG massed reinforcements to take over the Sarrin Grain Silos, retaking the village of Manifa Avi in the process.

On 19 April, YPG forces captured the village of Ras al Ayn, allowing the Kurds to sever ISIL's supply line to Sarrin from the east, and effectively besieging the town from both the east and the west. The clashes resulted in the deaths of at least 10 ISIL militants. Also, YPG-led forces began attacking the last ISIL supply route to Sarrin, which lay south of the town. On 21 April, YPG and allied forces had retaken the territory lost to ISIL up to the M4 Highway, capturing the Sarrin Grain Silos, Septe, and the other neighboring villages, allowing YPG forces to resume their southward advance towards Sarrin. However, on the next day, it was reported that the Sarrin Grain Silos was still held by around 50 ISIL militants, but that a “near total” siege had been imposed on them.

=== Push into Sarrin and offensive stalls ===
On 25 April, Kurdish forces and their allies surrounded the town on three sides and started to push into the northern, western, and eastern suburbs, after breaching ISIL's defense line. The YPG claimed that ISIL forces had retreated into the urban areas of the town. According to at least one source, YPG and FSA forces managed to enter the northern part of Sarrin. As of 27 April, ISIL forces in Sarrin continued receiving more reinforcements from the south, which caused the YPG-led offensive in Sarrin to stall at that point. Meanwhile, recurring ISIL attacks to the north on the village of Mitras, which started early on 22 April, were repelled, while up to 50 ISIL fighters were still holding out at the Grain Silos.

== Aftermath ==
Early on 29 April 2015, the last 124 Peshmerga fighters stationed in Kobanî returned to Iraqi Kurdistan, as the city had been secured. Iraqi Kurdistan also stated that no more troops would be sent to Kobanî.

On 9 May 2015, it was reported by local sources that ISIL commander Abu Omar al-Shishani was personally leading the ISIL ground forces in Sarrin. By 11 May, after several more days of repeated breakout attempts from Khirbat al-Burj and the Sarrin Grain Silos, it was reported that the number of remaining ISIL militants in those two YPG-besieged pockets had dwindled significantly.

In mid-May 2015, it was revealed that the YPG sieges of the Sarrin Grain Silos and Khirbat al-Burj were not completely secure, as ISIL was infiltrating fighters and supplies from Sarrin to the two besieged pockets.

On 25 May, ISIL launched an assault to the north of Sarrin, breaking through Kurdish lines, capturing the villages of Mitras and Jabiriyah, and temporarily relieving the sieges of the Sarrin Grain Silos and Khirbat al-Burj. ISIL fighters also reduced Kurdish control of Sarrin to the western outskirts of the town. By 31 May, clashes erupted in the area that ISIL had recently captured, as YPG-led fighters attempted to retake the area.

On 5 June, YPG-led fighters recaptured the village of Jabiriyah, to the east of Mitras, while clashes continued in the area stretching from Sarrin to the Sarrin Grain Silos. ISIL also retook the western part of the Sarrin, while YPG-led fighters pushed towards the eastern outskirts of the town.

On 18 June 2015, it was reported that the FSA and YPG had launched a new offensive on the town of Sarrin. The goal of taking Sarrin became more crucial after the Kobanî massacre at the end of June. On 1 July, YPG-led forces had re-established the sieges of the Sarrin Grain Silos and Khirbat al-Burj, and fully besieged Sarrin itself by 4 July.

== See also ==
- Sinjar massacre
- Northern Iraq offensive (August 2014)
- December 2014 Sinjar offensive
- November 2015 Sinjar offensive
- Siege of Kobanî
- Eastern al-Hasakah offensive
- Salahuddin campaign
- Second Battle of Tikrit (March–April 2015)
- Anbar offensive (2015)
- Qalamoun offensive (May–June 2015)
- Palmyra offensive (May 2015)
- Al-Hasakah offensive (May 2015)
- Tell Abyad offensive (2015)
- Battle of Al-Hasakah (June–August 2015)
- 2015 Ramadan attacks
  - Kobanî massacre
- Military intervention against ISIL
  - American-led intervention in Syria
- List of wars and battles involving ISIL
- Timeline of ISIL related events
