= Hasakah offensive =

Hasakah offensive may refer to:

- Eastern Hasakah offensive
- Western Hasakah offensive
- Hasakah city offensive
