= Qalamoun offensive =

Qalamoun offensive may refer to:

- Battle of Qalamoun (2013–2014)
- Qalamoun offensive (2014)
- Qalamoun offensive (May–June 2015)
- Qalamoun offensive (2017)
