= Battle of Sarrin (June–July 2015) =

Military operation

- Part of the Syrian civil war, Syrian Kurdish–Islamist conflict (2013–present), and the American-led intervention in Syria
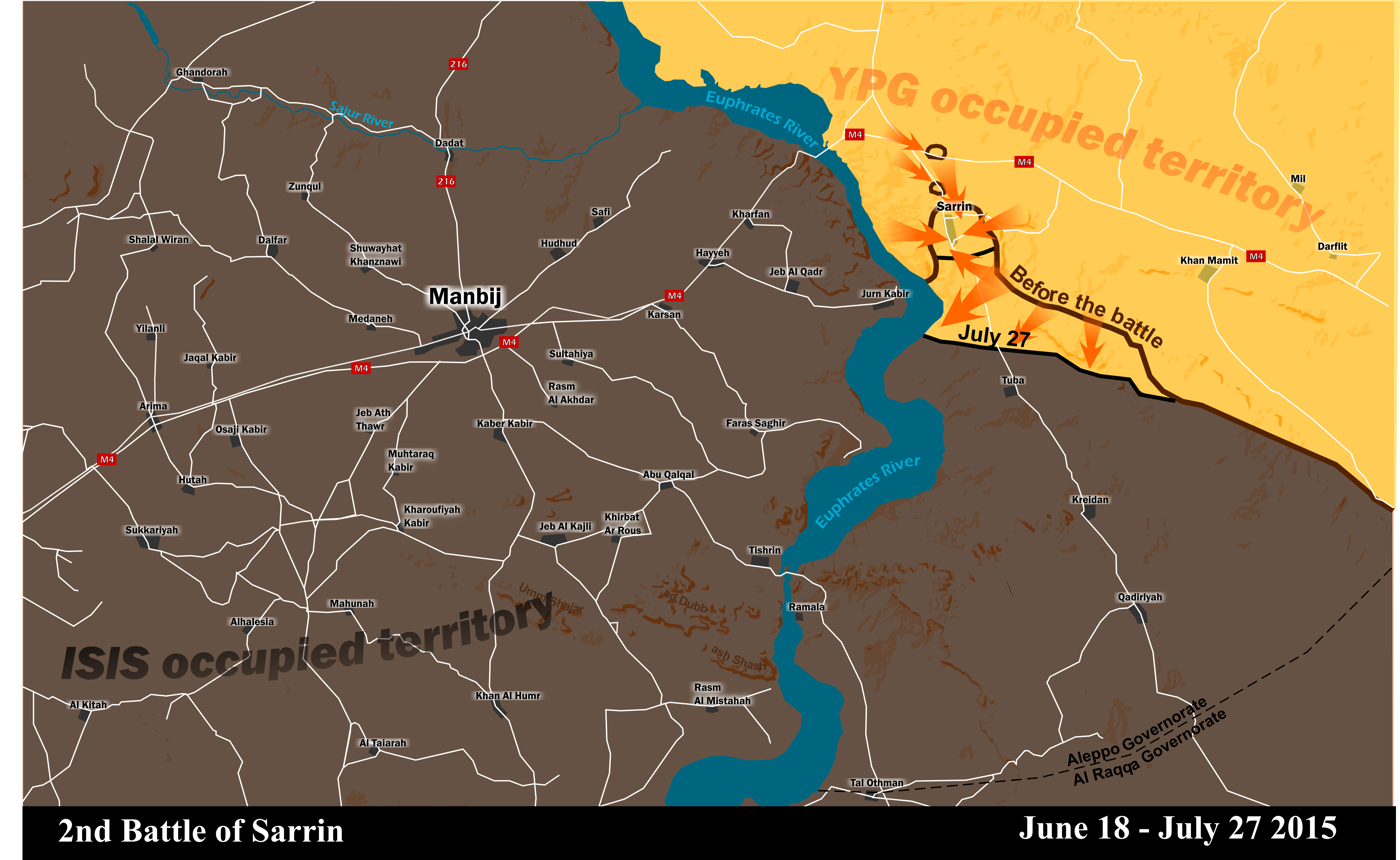
- YPG advances during the battle
Date	18 June 2015 – 27 July 2015 (1 month, 1 week and 2 days)
Location	Sarrin, Ayn al-Arab District, Syria 36.5875°N 38.299722°E
Result	YPG-led victory
Territorial changes	YPG-led forces capture Sarrin on 27 July, along with 25 villages and 20+ farms

Belligerents
Autonomous Administration of North and East Syria; YPG; YPJ; Free Syrian Army; Airstrikes: CJTF–OIR	Islamic State

Commanders and leaders
(Democratic Autonomous Administration of North and East Syria) Salih Muslim Muhammad	Abu Ali al-Anbari (Deputy, Syria); Abu Omar al-Shishani (Field commander)

Units involved
Euphrates Volcano: YPG; YPJ; (Syria) Dawn of Freedom Brigades; (Syria) Liwa Thuwwar al-Raqqa; (Syria) Al-Qassas Army; (Syria) Jarabulus Brigade; (Syria) Jaysh al-Thuwar; (United States) 9th Bomb Squadron	ISIL Armed Forces: Wilayat Halab

Strength
Unknown	300–410+ fighters

Casualties and losses
20 killed	80+ killed
- Location within Syria

The Battle of Sarrin (June–July 2015) was a military operation during 2015 in the northeastern Aleppo Governorate, during the Syrian civil war, in which the Kurdish YPG and Free Syrian Army forces captured the town of Sarrin and the surrounding region from the Islamic State (IS).

Following nearly two months of a stalled earlier offensive, YPG-led fighters renewed offensive operations on Sarrin on 18 June 2015, followed by a full-fledged operation on 1 July, after ISIL's Kobanî massacre. On 4 July, the town of Sarrin was fully besieged by YPG and FSA forces, as well as the village of Khirbat al-Burj and the Sarrin Grain Silos, both located north of Sarrin. On 12 July, ISIL forces managed to break the sieges and reestablish a supply line to Sarrin, after receiving reinforcements. However, on July 24, YPG and Free Syrian Army forces reestablished the siege of Sarrin, with the sieges of the Sarrin Grain Silos and Khirbat al-Burj being fully re-established by the next day. On 27 July, YPG-led forces fully captured Sarrin and the surrounding region, including 25 surrounding villages and 20+ farmlands, and the YPG declared the end of their offensive.

== Background ==
In mid-March 2015, the YPG and the allied Euphrates Volcano (Burkān al-Furāt) forces, backed by Coalition air support, launched an assault towards Sarrin, which was considered the last major ISIL stronghold in the Kobanî countryside.

On 25 April 2015, Kurdish forces and their allies surrounded the town on three sides and pushed into its suburbs, after breaching ISIL's defense lines. The YPG claimed that ISIL forces had retreated into the urban areas of the town. However, due to the continued arrival of ISIL reinforcements from the south, the YPG-led offensive in Sarrin stalled two days later.

On 25 May, ISIL launched an assault to the north of Sarrin, breaking through Kurdish lines, capturing the villages of Mitras and Jabiriyah, and temporarily relieving the sieges of the Sarrin Grain Silos and Khirbat al-Burj. ISIL fighters also reduced Kurdish control of Sarrin to the western outskirts of the town. By 31 May, clashes erupted in the area that ISIL had recently captured, as YPG-led fighters attempted to retake the area.

On 5 June, YPG-led fighters recaptured the village of Jabiriyah, to the east of Mitras, while clashes continued in the area stretching from Sarrin to the Sarrin Grain Silos. ISIL retook the western part of the Sarrin, while YPG-led fighters pushed towards the eastern outskirts of the town.

== The battle ==
=== Renewed offensive ===
On 18 June 2015, it was reported that the FSA and YPG had launched a new offensive on the town of Sarrin, with YPG forces attacking from the north, supported by an FSA push from the east. YPG-led fighters also recaptured the village of Mitras. On 25 June 2015, it was reported that around 175–400 ISIL militants were present in the Sarrin area.

On 30 June, YPG-led fighters launched an operation to capture the town of Sarrin, in retaliation for the Kobanî massacre. On 1 July, YPG-led forces had re-established the sieges of the Sarrin Grain Silos and Khirbat al-Burj, and pushed towards Sarrin from the north. The YPG also captured the remaining hills and villages to the west of Sarrin.

On 2 July, YPG and FSA forces to the southeast of Sarrin advanced westward, towards the village of Magharatayn, threatening the last ISIL supply route to the south of Sarrin. On 3 July, YPG-led forces captured Magharatayn and advanced towards the village of Malhah, located just west of Magharatayn, nearly severing the last road leading into Sarrin. Meanwhile, ISIL continued to send reinforcements from the south, as well as from the west bank of the Euphrates River, via covert boat crossings.

=== Besieging Sarrin ===
On 4 July, the YPG, backed by Coalition airstrikes, was reportedly making further advances. On the same day, it was reported that YPG-led forces captured the villages of Magharatayn and Malhah, to the south of Sarrin, severing the last supply route to Sarrin, and fully besieging the town. In response, ISIL carried out multiple vehicle bomb attacks in the area.

On 7 July, ISIL was reportedly sending reinforcements to the south of Sarrin, in an attempt to break the siege of the town. At the same time, ISIL forces in Sarrin advanced southward towards Malhah, in an attempt to reopen the cut supply route. ISIL also detonated more vehicle bombs in the area, including a vehicle bomb at the village of Nur Ali, in an attempt to slow down the Kurdish-led offensive. Two of the vehicle bomb attacks were said to have been carried out by 16-year-olds.

On 9 July, US-led Coalition airstrikes were reported to have dispersed ISIL forces in Sarrin into parts of the outskirts, whom were trying to avoid further airstrikes. On the same day, YPG led-forces tightened the siege of the town, and pushed into the eastern neighborhood of Sarrin.

On 12 July, ISIL broke the siege in a counterattack, recapturing the village of Malhah, and reopening the supply route to the south of Sarrin. ISIL also relieved its besieged forces in Khirbat al-Burj and the Sarrin Grain Silos, and recaptured the villages of Mitras, Qasiq al Qibli (to the east of the Sarrin Grain Silos), with ISIL forces cutting across the M4 Highway at the Sarrin Grain Silos. ISIL forces also captured several villages around Sarrin; however, the YPG and FSA continued to control the high ground to the east and the west of Sarrin, still besieging the town from two sides. Later on the same day, YPG and FSA counterattacks halted the ISIL advance in the area, with YPG-led forces recapturing some of the lost villages.

On 18 July, YPG-led forces recaptured the village of Qasiq al Qibli, to the east of the Sarrin Grain Silos, with ISIL forces reportedly fleeing from the battle towards Sarrin. Although ISIL continued to reinforce its forces in Sarrin from the south, including cross-river operations, it was reported that ISIL was unable to make any further gains since its counterattack on 12 July. Later on 18 July, YPG-led forces recaptured the village of Mitras, with the village of Qal at Hadid being fully secured by YPG-led forces on the next day. By 19 July, YPG and FSA fighters had recaptured the segment of the M4 Highway in the region, fully besieging ISIL fighters in the Sarrin Grain Silos once again, and capturing multiple villages to the east and the west of Sarrin.

On 21 July, YPG and FSA forces had advanced to the eastern and western outskirts of Sarrin again, with ISIL reportedly reinforcing houses and preparing the roads in Sarrin for a YPG-led push into the town. ISIL fighters were also continuing to resupply their fighters from the south of Sarrin.

On 22 July, ISIL attempted to recapture Mitras and to cross the M4 Highway again; however, this attack was repelled by multiple US-led Coalition airstrikes and a YPG-led counterattack. Around the same time, it was reported that heavy clashes had broken out around the urban areas of Khirbat al-Burj and Sarrin. Meanwhile, the ISIL fighters left in the Sarrin Grain Silos remained besieged by YPG-led forces.

On 23 July, multiple US-led Coalition airstrikes struck ISIL fortifications and troop concentrations inside of Sarrin and to the south of the town.

On 24 July, YPG-led forces advanced again, crossing the highway and capturing the village of Malhah, once again cutting off ISIL's last supply route to Sarrin. Heavy fighting continued around the urban areas of Sarrin. It was reported that the Euphrates Volcano (Burkan Al-Firat) forces had been pounding Sarrin with artillery for the past week, and that ISIL shot at civilians who tried to leave the town. On the next day, YPG and FSA forces advanced further southward, capturing the village of Milhah, located to the south of Malhah, further securing the siege of Sarrin. Later on the same day, in response to the YPG and FSA advances, ISIL attacked YPG fighters on the road between Magharatayn and Malhah, which ran into the southern part of Sarrin, before firing mortar bombs on the area after their initial attack failed.

=== Battle for Sarrin ===
On 25 July, YPG-led forces captured most of the villages around Sarrin, re-establishing the siege of Khirbat al-Burj, to the north of Sarrin, as well as fully securing the northern approaches to Sarrin. Meanwhile, ISIL forces in the besieged Sarrin Grain Silos continued to hold out. YPG-led forces were also reported to have stormed the town of Sarrin, entering the eastern neighborhoods of the town. On the same day, ISIL attempted to launch another wave of vehicle bomb attacks to stop the YPG and FSA advance; however, the YPG-led forces reportedly destroyed the vehicles before ISIL was ready, killing 7 ISIL militants. ISIL also attacked the villages of Shuikh and Qara Qozak, but YPG-led fighters repelled these attacks as well, killing at least one ISIL fighter.

On 26 July, ISIL militants holed up inside of the Sarrin Grain Silos blew up part of the structure, with the main tower collapsing from the detonation. YPG-led forces captured the grain silos shortly afterwards. Later on the same day, YPG and FSA forces were reported to have secured most of the southern portion of Sarrin, after heavy US-led Coalition airstrikes. YPG fighters also attacked suspected ISIL militants between the villages of Geydade and Sina, to the northwest of Sarrin, killing five ISIL militants. On the night of 26 July, YPG-led forces captured the security center at the center of Sarrin, while ISIL militants were said to have run out of ammunition. Around the same time, a convoy of ISIL fighters from Sarrin attempted to escape across the Euphrates River; however, the YPG destroyed the convoy, killing 17 ISIL militants.

On 27 July, YPG and FSA forces captured the besieged village of Khirbat al-Burj, the last village outside of Sarrin that was still held by ISIL. On the same day, YPG-led forces fully captured the town of Sarrin from ISIL. In the following events, it was reported that YPG forces had swept the village and arrested 150 men accused of being members or collaborators of ISIL.

== Aftermath ==
On 29 July, the SOHR reported that violent clashes had erupted between the YPG and ISIL at the banks of the Euphrates River, near Sarrin, which resulted in casualties on both sides.

On 30 July, an ISIL sleeper in Sarrin, as well as some ISIL fighters from the village of Serekaniye, in the northeastern Aleppo Province, managed to infiltrate the eastern part of Sarrin, dressed up as civilians. The ISIL militants launched a suicide attack and a gun battle. The attack was eventually repelled by Euphrates Volcano forces, and resulted in the deaths of 9 ISIL militants and 13 YPG fighters.

On the night of 4 August, YPG-led fighters conducted an operation near the village of Milha, to the south of Sarrin, killing a number of ISIL fighters.

On the night of 7 August, ISIL fighters on the western bank of the Euphrates River targeted Kurdish positions on the hilltops west of Sarrin with mortar fire. YPG-led forces responded by opening fire on ISIL positions across the river.

== Strategic analysis ==
Sarrin has been deemed as strategically important, because the town was the last stronghold that ISIL controlled in the countryside of Kobanî, and because ISIL had used Sarrin as a launchpad to attack Kobanî and other villages in the region. After the capture of Sarrin and the surrounding region, it was expected that ISIL attacks against villages in the Kobanî Canton would be curbed significantly. The capture of Sarrin was also deemed to be a major defeat for ISIL, with the town's capture severing ISIL's main access route to parts of the Aleppo Governorate.

== See also ==
- 2015 Ramadan attacks
- Siege of Kobanî
- Northern Iraq offensive (August 2014)
- December 2014 Sinjar offensive
- November 2015 Sinjar offensive
- Sinjar massacre
- Syrian Kurdish–Islamist conflict (2013–present)
- Salahuddin campaign (2014–15)
- Al-Hasakah offensive (February–March 2015)
- Second Battle of Tikrit (March–April 2015)
- Anbar offensive (2015)
- Tell Abyad offensive (2015)
- Al-Hasakah offensive (May 2015)
- Palmyra offensive (May 2015)
- Qalamoun offensive (May–June 2015)
- Battle of Al-Hasakah (June–August 2015)
- Al-Hawl offensive
- Tishrin Dam offensive
- Military intervention against ISIL
  - American-led intervention in Syria
- List of wars and battles involving ISIL
- Timeline of ISIL related events
