= Qalamoun offensive (2014) =

Military operation of the Syrian Civil War

- Part of the Hezbollah involvement in the Syrian civil war and Syrian Civil War spillover in Lebanon
- Battle of Western Qalamoun (2013–2017) Lebanese Government & Hezbollah control Syrian Government & Hezbollah control Syrian Opposition control For a war map of the current situation in Rif Dimashq, see here.
| Date | 21 June – 7 August 2014 (1 month, 2 weeks and 3 days) |
| Location | Qalamoun Mountains, Syria and Arsal, Lebanon |
| Result | Partial Syrian Army & Hezbollah/Lebanese Army victory: Hezbollah captures all hills around rebel hideouts on both sides of the border establishing a siege; Lebanese Army recaptures the Lebanese town of Arsal from rebel forces |

Belligerents
| Islamic Front (Syrian opposition) Free Syrian Army; Al-Nusra Front Islamic State | Syria; Lebanon; Hezbollah |

Commanders and leaders
| Abu Ahmed Jumaa (POW); Abu Hasan al-Homsi † (Arsal commander) | (Lebanon) Jean Kahwaji |

Units involved
| Unknown | Syrian Armed Forces; Syrian Army; Republican Guard; Qalamoun Shield Forces; National Defense Force; Air Force Intelligence Directorate; Usud al-Cherubim; Ministry of Interior; Syrian Special Mission Forces; (Lebanon) Lebanese Armed Forces; Internal Security Forces |

Strength
| 3,000 fighters | 12,000 Lebanese Army |

Casualties and losses
| 20+ killed (Syrian and Lebanese government claims) | Unknown Syrian and Hezbollah casualties 20 Lebanese soldiers killed, 85 wounded and 24 captured (14 released, 4 executed); 20 policemen captured (6 released) |

The Qalamoun offensive (2014) was launched by the Syrian Army, in coordination with the Iranian-backed Shia militia Hezbollah, during the Syrian Civil War against remnant rebel forces following the previous Battle of Qalamoun which resulted in the military securing all of the towns in the region.

== Background ==
In mid-November 2013, the Syrian military, backed up by Hezbollah, launched an offensive against the rebel-held Qalamoun Mountains in an attempt to cut rebel supply lines to Damascus from Lebanon. The strategic region had been used by rebel forces as a rear base for its operations around the capital Damascus. The battle was primarily led on the rebel side by Al-Nusra Front. By late April 2014, the last major rebel stronghold in the region fell to the military as it secured all of the towns in the region. However, 3,000 rebels retreated into the mountains to conduct guerrilla hit-and-run attacks.

== Offensive ==
=== Surrounding of Tfail ===
On 14 June, a rebel commander claimed that 29 Hezbollah fighters were killed (11 by an ambush) in and around Rankous over a period of two days. Hezbollah sources confirmed that fighting was taking place in Rankous.

Four days later, the Army advanced to within a kilometer from the Lebanese border village of Tfail, which is surrounded on three sides by Syria, with fears that government forces, including Hezbollah, would tighten their grip on the village. On 21 June, the military captured the Syrian territory surrounding the village as 70 rebels surrendered. This advance left the outskirts of Tfail on the Syrian side under Syrian Army control. Rebels in the village were allowed to return to Syria along with their families. That morning, Hezbollah fighters entered Tfail in search of opposition fighters reportedly seeking refuge in the village.

On 22 June, government forces launched an assault on the foothills of the Qalamoun mountains and state TV claimed the troops had captured some hills overlooking the Rankous plain and cut the route used by rebels to periodically return to the region. At this point, it was confirmed 14 Hezbollah fighters had been killed in the previous two weeks in the area. The rebels had been hiding in the heights and caves after the offensive, but started to conduct hit-and-run attacks on government positions in the previous weeks and managing to retake some positions.

On 27 June, Syrian state TV stated that government forces captured areas near the Lebanese border, cutting rebel supply lines. Syrian troops had also reached the edge of Tfail.

=== Battle for the hills ===
In mid-July, Hezbollah started an operation to clear the border area of remnant rebel forces. At the start of the operation, Hezbollah forces were ambushed but soon called up reinforcements. After two days of fighting, Hezbollah took control of the hills near the Lebanese village of Youneen. It was confirmed 6–7 Hezbollah and 17–32 rebel fighters were killed and 31 Hezbollah and 23 rebel fighters were wounded. 14 rebels were also captured. According to another report, Hezbollah lost 14 fighters, while 104 rebels of the Al-Nusra Front were killed and 40 rebels were captured.

Days later, another round of fighting along the outskirts of Arsal and the Lebanese town of Al-Fakiha left two Hezbollah militiamen and dozens of rebels dead, with an additional seven rebels captured. The Syrian army unleashed rocket salvos on rebel pockets as warplanes provided aerial cover for Hezbollah fighters working to cut off supply routes from Arsal. A security source confirmed more than 100 people had been killed since the start of the Hezbollah operation, including an aid to the rebel spokesman of the Abdullah Azzam Brigades.

In one instance during the battle for the hills, a Hezbollah squad seized a hill, east of the Lebanese village of Nahle, from the rebels. They were then replaced with a 40-man unit that lacked ammunition and radio batteries. Soon, 250 Syrian rebels launched a counter-attack, using the rugged terrain to approach right up to the Hezbollah positions. At one point, the rebels were only 10 meters from the Hezbollah fighters. The five-hour battle ended after Hezbollah reinforcements arrived, who were alerted to the battle by the sound of gunfire, and the rebel attack was repelled. 10 Hezbollah militiamen were killed and 20 wounded.

On 25 July, the Syrian air force struck rebel forces east of Arsal, killing 20 rebels. Two days later, Hezbollah repelled an attempt by rebels to capture a strategic hill between Arsal and Flitah.

By the end of July, Hezbollah captured the hills around rebel hideouts in both the Qalamoun region and in the mountains bordering Shiite villages in northeastern Lebanon, thus establishing a siege on the rebel forces. Hezbollah monitored the rebel supply lines and fired at any groups attempting to provide the rebels with aid.

During the night between 1 and 2 August, government troops, backed up by Hezbollah militiamen, ambushed rebel forces near the town of al-Jobeh, around 10 km from the border. The attack also included artillery strikes. As a result of the ambush, 50–170 rebels and 7–11 government fighters, including 2 Hezbollah members, were killed. Other sources claimed 200 rebels, 20 soldiers and two Hezbollah militiamen were killed.

=== Battle of Arsal ===
On 2 August, after Lebanese security forces arrested an Al-Nusra Front commander, Syrian rebels surrounded Lebanese Army checkpoints in the region before attacking them and storming Arsal's police station. The rebels than proceeded to take control of the town. 16 policemen were taken hostage, as well as two soldiers who were freed by the military later in the day. The fighting continued into the next day.

On 4 August, the military had advanced and captured the technical institute building, which was seized by the militants the previous day, as the town came under heavy shell fire from multiple directions. In the evening, the Army also managed to capture Ras al-Serj hill.

On 5 August, the military was attempting to capture two government buildings. During the day's fighting, the ISIS commander for the Arsal area was reportedly killed, while al-Nusra forces retreated from the town. In the evening, a 24-hour cease-fire started.

By 7 August, ISIS forces had also retreated from the town and a fragile truce was established and redeployed along the border with Syria. Their hideouts there were subsequently bombed by the Syrian Air Force, resulting in dozens of wounded militants. Two days later, the Lebanese Army entered Arsal in full force and re-established control over checkpoints that the militants had previously seized. By this point, the military death toll had risen to 18, which was updated to 19 by 12 August. 60 militants were also confirmed dead, as well as 42 civilians. The total number of civilians wounded was estimated at 400.

== Aftermath ==
After the offensive, the Al-Nusra Front and the Islamic State of Iraq and the Levant maintained a foothold in the region's rugged terrain. On 25 August 2014, over 20 FSA factions merged into the Gathering of Western Qalamoun group. On 31 December 2014, six eastern Qalamoun FSA brigades also formed the Mujahideen Shura Council. At the same time the Ahmad al-Abdo Martyrs Brigades and Battalions, Jaysh al-Islam, Ahrar ash-Sham, al-Rahman Legion and the Jaysh Usud al-Sharqiya Islamist militia also formed a joint force in Qalamoun's eastern areas.

The arrival of an ISIS expeditionary force in December 2014, lead to a wave of FSA defections into ISIS numbering in the hundreds, further boosting the Islamic State's presence in the region, which reached approximately 1,000 fighters. Al-Nusra maintained 600 militants in Qalamoun's eastern areas, forging an alliance with ISIS in the region.

On 4 January 2015, ISIS captured the village of Flita, but a joint government and Hezbollah counter-attack recaptured the village. On 23 January 2015, Lebanese armed forces closed the Jdaydet Yabous border crossing, following clashes during which rebels captured a Lebanese military base at Tallet al-Hamra. The following day, the rebels also seized a Syrian Army base adjacent to the crossing.

In late January 2015, ISIS announced its intention to further reinforce its positions in the Qalamoun region, in order to gain a launch pad for future operations in Lebanon. Sheikh Ahmed Assir was also appointed as an ISIS emir in Lebanon.

Between 25 and 28 March 2015, the Syrian Army and Hezbollah captured two hills near Flita and several others in the Zabadani region. The fighting left 30 rebels dead. The Lebanese Army also seized some positions on the outskirts of Arsal from jihadist fighters. By 3 April, the Syrian military had advanced on three axes towards Zabadani, securing the western and eastern approaches to the city, and relatively paralyzing the defending rebels. 15 al-Nusra fighters attempting to reinforce the rebels in Zabadani were killed trying to breach the cordon.

In mid-April, opposition forces captured a strategic hill overlooking Flita that had been held by Hezbollah fighters. At this time, Hezbollah was preparing for a new offensive, considered to be a decisive battle for Qalamoun, while the rebels were making efforts to unite different warring opposition groups in an effort to take control of the Qalamoun region. However, ISIS and al-Nusra were still competing to win over communities in the Arsal area and the rebels in both Zabadani’s mountains range and in the Anti-Lebanon Mountains switched from offense to defense. They were preparing trenches, tunnels, bunkers and barricades in anticipation of a possible battle in the spring.

In late April, a series of Israeli Air Force airstrikes (April 2015 Qalamoun incident) hit targets and bases in the Qalamoun region, killing several Syrian soldiers and Hezbollah members. Also, 6 Hezbollah members were reportedly killed in an al-Nusra Front ambush.

In early May, al-Nusra Front and allied Islamists launched a preemptive attack against SAA and Hezbollah forces, capturing several positions. The same day, Hezbollah ambushed an al-Nusra convoy near Tfail, killing 15 and wounding 30 militants. A few days later, the Syrian Army and Hezbollah seized control of a number of hilltops overlooking Assal al-Ward, reportedly killing dozens of rebels. At the same time, Hezbollah reportedly decided following an in-depth military assessment study to cancel their long-awaited offensive in the region after determining there was no need for a costly assault and instead to focus on cutting off all access ISIS and the al-Nusra Front might have to any Lebanese or Syrian towns. Also, the Army of Conquest announced a branch in Qalamoun that would battle both the SAA, Hezbollah and ISIS.
