= Sarrin =

Sarrin صرين
- Town
- Location within Syria
- Coordinates: 36°35′15″N 38°17′59″E
- Country: Syria
- Governorate: Aleppo
- District: Ayn al-Arab
- Subdistrict: Sarrin
- Elevation: 356 m (1,168 ft)

Population (2004 census)
  - Total: 6,104
  - Subdistrict: 70,522
- Time zone: UTC+3 (AST)
- P-Code: C2074
- Geocode: SY020602

Sarrin (Arabic: صرين), also spelled Serrin or Sareen is a town in northern Syria, administratively part of the Aleppo Governorate, located northeast of Aleppo. It is situated 3 kilometers east of the Euphrates River, south of Kobanî and east of Manbij.

Sarrin is the administrative center of Nahiya Sarrin of the Ayn al-Arab District.

In the 2004 census, the town of Sarrin had a population of 6,140, while the Sarrin subdistrict had a total population of 70,522. The inhabitants of the town are predominantly Arab.

== Civil war and conflict ==
During the Syrian Civil War, the Islamic State of Iraq and the Levant seized control of the town in September 2013.

In March 2015, Kurds from the People's Protection Units (YPG), alongside Free Syrian Army (FSA) rebels, launched an attack to take control of the strategic town. On 27 July 2015, the town came under the control of Kurdish YPG forces.

On 29 January 2025, as a result of a Turkish airstrike 13 people were killed and 20 others wounded.

In January 2026, Sarrin came under the control of forces affiliated with the Syrian transitional government.

== See also ==
- Battle of Sarrin (June–July 2015)
