= Kobanî massacre =

2015 ISIL attacks on Kurds in Kobanî, northern Syria

Coordinates: 36.8897°N 38.3556°E

- Part of the Syrian civil war, the Rojava–Islamist conflict, the American-led intervention in Syria, and the 26 June 2015 Islamist attacks
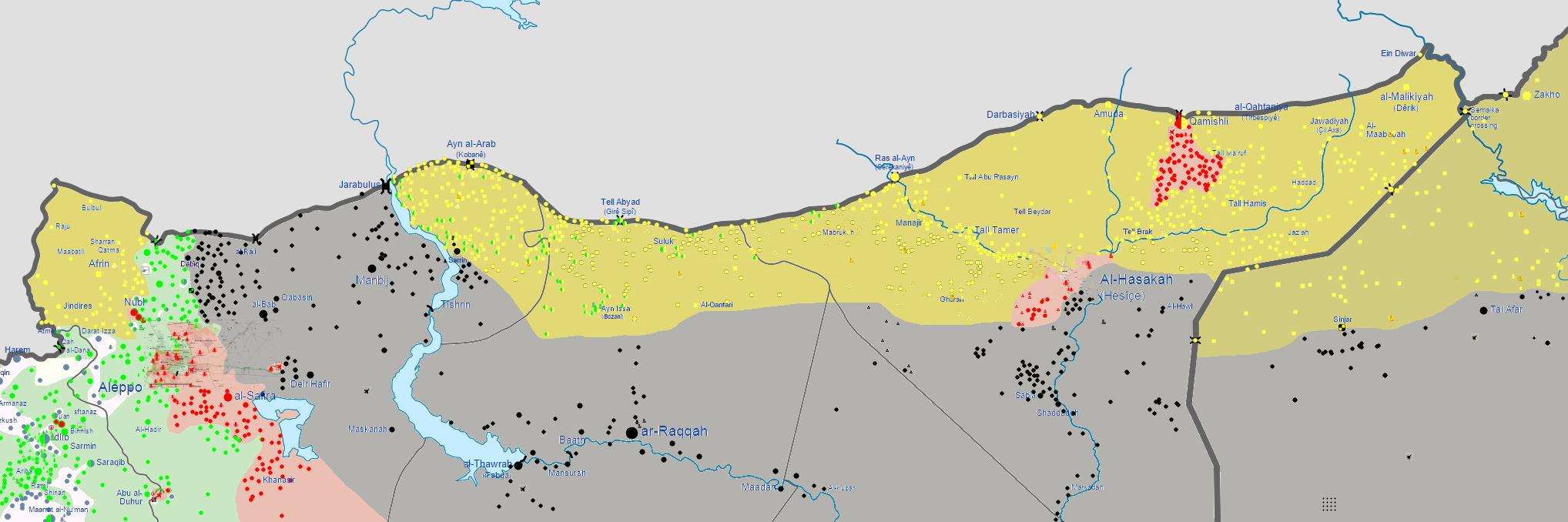
- Territories controlled by the YPG, ISIL, the Syrian Army, Free Syrian Army, or contested in northern Syria, as of late June 2015
Date	25–29 June 2015 (4 days)
Location	Kobanê, Aleppo Governorate, Syria
Result	YPG-led forces kill all ISIL militants: ISIL massacres 233 civilians in Kobanê and in the village of Barkh Butan

Belligerents
Autonomous Administration of North and East Syria; YPG; YPJ; Supported by: CJTF–OIR	Islamic State

Commanders and leaders
(Democratic Autonomous Administration of North and East Syria) Salih Muslim	Abu Ali al-Anbari (Deputy, Syria)

Units involved
	ISIL Armed Forces: Wilayat Halab

Strength
Unknown	80–100 militants

Casualties and losses
35–37 killed	79–92 killed (12 suicide bombers), 1 captured
- 223–233 civilians killed and 300+ injured

The Kobanî massacre was a combination of suicide missions and attacks on Kurdish civilians by the Islamic State of Iraq and the Levant on the Kurdish-majority city of Kobanî, beginning on Thursday, 25 June 2015, and culminating on Friday, 26 June 2015. The attacks continued into 28 June 2015, with the last remaining ISIL militant being killed on the following day. The attacks resulted in 223–233 civilians dead, as well as 35–37 Kurdish militiamen and at least 79 ISIL assailants. It was the second-largest massacre committed by ISIL since it declared a caliphate in June 2014.

== Background ==
The People's Protection Units (YPG) captured Kobanê on 19 July 2012. Since July 2012, Kobanê has been under Kurdish control, while the YPG and Kurdish politicians anticipate autonomy for the area, which they consider part of Rojava. After similar less intense events earlier in 2014, on 2 July the town and surrounding villages came under a massive attack from fighters of the Islamic State of Iraq and the Levant. On 16 September, ISIL resumed its siege of Kobanê with a full-scale assault from the west and the south of the city.

The Kobanî Canton was attacked by ISIL militants for several months. In September 2014, ISIL militants occupied most of Kobanî Canton, seizing more than 100 Kurdish villages. As a consequence of the ISIL occupation, up to 200,000 Kurdish refugees fled from Kobanî Canton to Turkey.

In the captured villages, ISIL militants committed massacres and kidnapped women. ISIL militants, however, were not able to occupy the entire canton, as the YPG and YPJ forces managed to defend the city of Kobanî and a few nearby settlements. After a few weeks of "neutrality", the US-led coalition began to target ISIL forces in Kobanî with a larger number of airstrikes, beginning on 5 October 2014. This move aided the YPG/YPJ in forcing ISIL to retreat from numerous parts of the city. The YPG reportedly forced ISIL to retreat from most of Kobanî on 26 January 2015, thus lifting the siege. On 27 January 2015, YPG-led fighters had retaken the entire city of Kobanî. Since then, the city was under YPG control.

During May and June 2015, the YPG, FSA, and allied forces captured huge swaths of territory in northern Syria, taking territory across the western Al-Hasakah province and the Tell Abyad region, linking the Kurdish Jazira and Kobanî Cantons.

== Massacre ==
The attack began on 25 June 2015, when fighters from the Islamic State of Iraq and the Levant detonated three car bombs in Kobanî, close to the Turkish border crossing. Kurdish forces and the Syrian government claimed the vehicles had entered the city from across the Turkish side of the border, an action denied by Turkey. An estimated force of 80–100 ISIL militants carried out the attack. ISIL fighters in five vehicles entered Kobani under cover of darkness in the early hours of Thursday, June 25, disguised themselves as Kurdish security forces, before infiltrating the city and shooting civilians with assault rifles and RPGs.

ISIL also committed a massacre in the village of Barkh Butan, about 20 kilometres south of Kobanî, executing at least 23 Syrian Kurds, among them women and children. A Kurdish spokesman told the media on the next day that the militants were still pinned in three locations in the city of Kobani, including a field hospital. More than 100 hostages were reported being held by ISIL fighters or were trapped due to the crossfire.

The battle in Kobanî city continued to rage for another 3 days, during which most of the ISIL attackers were killed, with 1 militant captured by the YPG, and only 7 escaping to Turkey.

During the afternoon of 29 June, the last remaining ISIL militant in Kobanî city was shot and killed.

== Casualties ==
Over 164 people were initially reported dead and 200 injured, making the attack one of the largest killings of civilians in the North of Syria. The final death toll of the attack was 223+ civilians, with over 300 injured.

== Responses ==
Rojava – Redur Xelil, the spokesman of the People's Protection Units (YPG), said that "Daesh (Isis) is carrying out a collective suicide attack, not to control Kobani or occupy it, but to kill the largest possible number of civilians".

Turkey – according to CNN Türk, Turkish president Recep Tayyip Erdoğan told a business group at a Ramadan-fast-breaking dinner that "No one has the right to portray Turkey as being on the same line as terrorism... after these reprehensible attacks, we see that circles close to the separatist organization, in other words, the political party, have undertaken a slanderous defamation campaign that knows no principles, morality nor bounds that targets our nation," referring to the HDP accusations.

- Peoples' Democratic Party (Turkey) – "The Turkish government has supported ISIL for years. Today's massacre is a part of this support," said Figen Yuksekdag, the co-leader of the Peoples' Democratic Party (HDP).

== See also ==
- Siege of Kobanî
- Al-Hasakah offensive (February–March 2015)
- Al-Hasakah offensive (May 2015)
- Tell Abyad offensive (2015)
- Battle of Sarrin (March–April 2015)
- Battle of Sarrin (June–July 2015)
- 2015 Ramadan attacks
- Battle of Al-Hasakah (June–August 2015)
- Syrian Kurdish–Islamist conflict (2013–present)
- List of terrorist incidents, 2015
