= 2015 Saint-Quentin-Fallavier attack =

2015 Islamist attack in southeastern France

Saint-Quentin-Fallavier attack
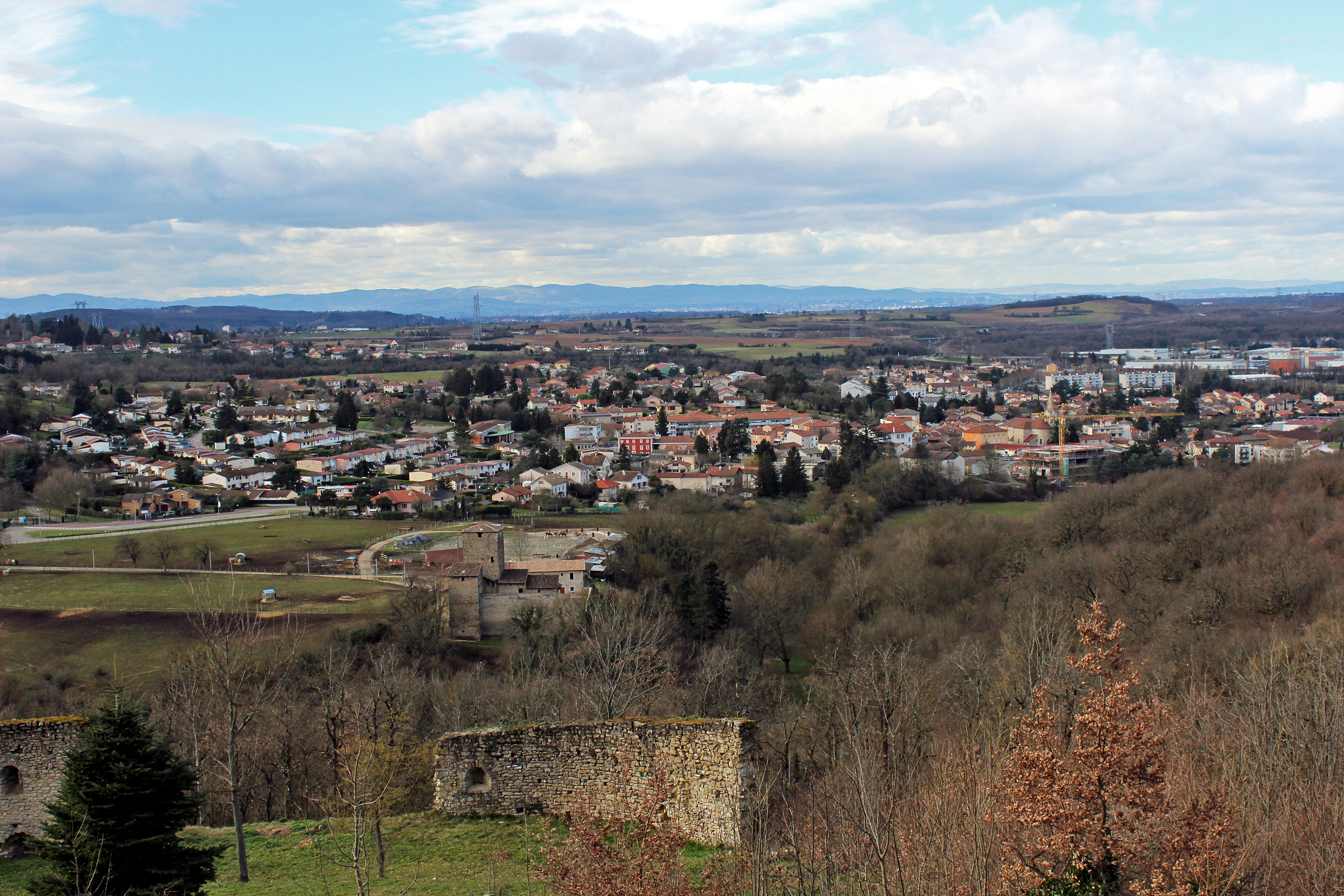
- The industrial estate is to the right of this image showing the town.

- Location of Isère within France
- Location: 45.6428°N 5.1250°E; Saint-Quentin-Fallavier, Isère, France
- Date: 26 June 2015; 09:30 CEST (UTC+02:00)
- Attack type: Beheading and Vehicular assault as a terrorist tactic
- Weapons: Knife, Van
- Deaths: 1
- Injuries: 2
- Perpetrator: ISIS (suspected)
- Assailant: Yassin Salhi X
- Motive: Islamic terrorism and anti-French sentiment

A terrorist attack took place on 26 June 2015 in Saint-Quentin-Fallavier, near Lyon, France, when a man, Yassin Salhi (Arabic: يَاسِين صَالِحِيّ), decapitated his employer Hervé Cornara and drove his van into gas cylinders at a gas factory in Saint-Quentin-Fallavier near Lyon, France, which caused an explosion that injured two other people. Salhi was arrested and charged with murder and attempted murder linked to terrorism. Three other people were questioned by the police but released without charge. Salhi committed suicide at Fleury-Mérogis Prison in December that year.

The attack occurred on the same day as several other Islamist terrorist attacks, which have subsequently been named the 2015 Ramadan attacks, though any relationship between the various incidents is disputed. French authorities believe that Salhi has links with the Islamist terrorist group the Islamic State of Iraq and Syria (ISIS). The attack occurred during heightened public fears over Islamist attacks in France, a few months after the Île-de-France attacks in January 2015, including the Charlie Hebdo shooting.

== Attack ==
At around 09:30 CEST (07:30 UTC) on 26 June 2015, Yassin Salhi, a delivery driver, gained entrance to the grounds of an Air Products factory in Saint-Quentin-Fallavier near the city of Lyon. He was driving a van with his dead 54-year-old employer, Hervé Cornara, inside it. He had tricked Cornara into getting into the van earlier that day, after which Salhi knocked him unconscious and strangled him. He then decapitated Cornara just before reaching the factory. Salhi had made regular visits to the factory, so he was known to employees at the site.

He placed Cornara's severed head on a fence railing and planted two Jihadist flag banners alongside it. The head had a cloth thrown over it with the Shahada written on it: "There is no god but Allah and Muhammad is his prophet." The headless body and a knife were found on the ground nearby. Salhi attempted to blow up the factory by ramming several gas cylinders, causing an explosion. Two other people were injured in the process. Video surveillance footage showed that the perpetrator also tried to open canisters containing flammable chemicals before being subdued minutes later. He shouted "Allahu Akhbar" as he met and was overpowered by firefighters responding to the scene. The perpetrator had also photographed himself with the slain victim and sent the image to at least one other person via WhatsApp, a French man who later joined ISIL.

== Perpetrator ==
Yassin Salhi
- Born: 25 March 1980; Pontarlier, France
- Died: 22 December 2015 (aged 35); Fleury-Mérogis, Île-de-France, France
- Occupation: Delivery driver
- Spouse: Unnamed wife
- Children: 3
- Status: Committed suicide before trial
- Criminal charges: Murder, attempted murder, terrorism. destruction by means of an explosive device

Yassin Salhi (25 March 1980 – 22 December 2015) was reported as the primary attacker, although he may not have acted alone. French police opened a file on Salhi in 2006, over suspected links with a radical Salafist group, but it was not renewed in 2008. In 2012, he was involved in an anti-Semitic attack on a Jewish teenager; the attack took place on a train travelling from Toulouse to Lyon. At the time of the 2015 attack, he was believed to be living in Saint-Priest, with his wife and three children.

Six years prior to the attack, Salhi spent a year in Syria with his wife and children, claiming he was there to learn Arabic. At the time of the attack, Salhi was also in regular contact with the French jihadist Sebastian Yunis, known to have left for Syria to join ISIS. Salhi claimed his reason for the attack was solely based on personal motives, saying a fight with his employer who fired him as well as a dispute with his wife pushed him to commit the attack. French authorities have linked him to ISIS.

Salhi's mother was Moroccan and his father, who died when Salhi was 16, was Algerian. Salhi grew up in Pontarlier, where he was tutored in Arabic by Amar Remimi, treasurer of the Philippe Grenier mosque association. In the mid-2000s, Salhi met and was radicalized by Frédéric Jean Salvi, who had served time at the nearby prison in Besançon until 2001. Salvi himself had converted to Islam while in prison, where he then became known as "Grand Ali". Salvi attended the same mosque in Pontarlier as Salhi, where he at one point was expelled for challenging the imam during a sermon. A coworker at the transport company, Abdel Karim, stated that Salhi had once asked him his opinion of Daesh. After hearing Karim's opinion, Salhi would no longer speak with him other than to say hello and goodbye.

According to his lawyer, Salhi had been earlier reprimanded by Cornara for dropping equipment from a pallet, and had attacked his former boss for personal reasons.

On 30 June, Salhi was charged with murder and attempted murder linked to terrorism, as well as destruction by means of an explosive substance.

On 22 December 2015, Salhi committed suicide in Fleury-Mérogis Prison by hanging himself with his bed sheets on the bars of his cell.

=== Related arrests ===
Another man was arrested hours after the attack at his home in Saint-Quentin-Fallavier. He was believed to be driving around the factory in a Ford Fusion car before the attack in a suspected reconnaissance attempt. On 26 June, he was released without charge.

Salhi's wife and sister were also arrested later that day. They were released without charge two days later. Earlier, his wife gave a radio interview, in which she denied the alleged terror links to the family.

== Victim ==
The decapitated victim, Hervé Cornara, was the 54-year-old manager of a transport company based in Chassieu, about 20 miles from the attack. He was married and had a son. He had employed Salhi as a delivery truck driver starting in March.

== Air Products ==
The company Air Products is a United States chemical company based in Allentown, Pennsylvania. Its president and CEO since July 2014, Seifi Ghasemi, is an Iranian-born Shia Muslim. In April 2015 the company won a contract to build, own and operate the world's largest industrial gas complex in Jazan, Saudi Arabia. Air Products officials said security had been increased at its operations around the world as a precautionary measure. The company has facilities in more than 50 countries employing more than 21,000 people.

== Domestic reaction ==
The President of France, François Hollande, left an EU summit in Brussels to return to France. Hollande said, "The attack bears the hallmarks of a terrorist attack." The French Minister of the Interior, Bernard Cazeneuve, was also reported to be traveling to the scene.

== Other Islamist attacks ==
The attack in Saint-Quentin-Fallavier was one of five Islamist attacks that took place on the same day around the world, including in Tunisia, Kuwait, Somalia, and Syria. These attacks came three days after an audio message by ISIS senior leader Abu Mohammad al-Adnani was released that encouraged militant sympathizers to attack one year after ISIS declared themselves a state, during the month of Ramadan.

== See also ==
- 2015 Ramadan attacks
- 2016 Normandy church attack
- List of terrorist incidents, 2015
- Vehicular assault as a terrorist tactic
- List of Islamist terrorist attacks
