= Tfail =

Tfail تفيل
- Village
- Location in Lebanon
- Coordinates: 33°51′N 36°22′E
- Country: Lebanon
- Governorate: Baalbek-Hermel Governorate
- District: Baalbek District
- Time zone: UTC+2 (EET)
  - Summer (DST): +3

Tfail (Arabic: طفيل, romanized: Ṭfayl) or Al-Tufayl is a village in eastern Baalbek District, Baalbek-Hermel Governorate, Lebanon. It is one of the highest villages in Lebanon. In 2014, the village's population was about 2,000 predominantly Sunni residents. The village lays at the tip of a finger of territory that juts into Syria.

== History ==
=== Attachment to Lebanon ===
In 1920 when France gained control of the region following World War One, they greatly expanded the Mount Lebanon Mutasarrifate to form Greater Lebanon (modern day Lebanon) however, the exact border between French Lebanon and French Syria remained murky. That would change in 1946 when both Syria and Lebanon gained their independence. A group of Syrian parliamentarians submitted a memorandum to the then-speaker Saadallah al-Jabri to pursue the return of the Hasbaya, Rashaya, Beqaa, and Baalbek regions to Syria which was forwarded to President Shukri al-Quwatli who dismissed it, stating that "It makes no difference whether these districts belong to Syria or Lebanon, for this nation will one day unite, and when that happens, there will be no Lebanon and no Syria, just one Arab nation." To this day the village remains contested with Syria.

=== Syrian civil war ===
During the early stages of the Syrian Civil War in 2014 Tfail saw an influx of an estimated 5,000 Syrian refugees which saw the Syrian government block its sole road into Syria while their allies in Hezbollah blocked its land border into Lebanon, cutting it off from the rest of the world. Tfail would be bombed by Syrian forces during the Qalamoun offensive with the Syrian government claiming that the refugees where actually Sunni Rebel forces that had turned the village into a base of operations. After the blockade was established, and the village was bombed and shelled, there was intense speculation that either the Syrian army, or Hezbollah, would attempt to storm the village, however, the presence of the Lebanese Army in the region dissuaded them.

On April 23, 2014, the Red Cross was able to open an aid convoy to the village delivering food and medicine. Upon its return to the Ram al-Marjouha staging post it was inspected for explosives and weapons and each of the nine medical evacuations where documented, as all but one of them had been Syrian rebels. The predominately Shia population of Lebanon's Beqaa Valley alleged that Tfail became an ISIS base as Syrian rebels had previously fired rockets at Hezbollah positions in the valley. Over June 21-22 Hezbollah forces would enter and search Tfail with the village's mukhtar stating they were "calm and orderly" and didn't detain or kill anyone before leaving, but also that most of the village's residents had been evacuated before they arrived.
