= Mount Abdulaziz =

Mountain ridge in Syria

- Location within Syria

Highest point
- Elevation: 932 m (3,058 ft)
- Coordinates: 36°24′29″N 40°18′30″E

Naming
- English translation: جبل عبد العزيز
- Language of name: ar

Geography
- Location: Hasakah Governorate, Syria

Mount Abdulaziz or Abd al-Aziz (Arabic: جبل عبدالعزيز, romanized: Jabal ʿAbdulʿazīz) is a mountain ridge located in the southwestern part of the Hasakah Governorate, some 35 km west-south-west from the center of the city of Hasakah, in northeastern Syria. The mountain has taken its name after Abdul Aziz, a Kurdish military commander in Saladin's army who had once taken the mountain as a fortified place. The former name of the mountain was ʾAl-Ḥiyāl الحيال. During the Syrian civil war in March 2013, the mountain and its surrounding area came under the control of the Al-Nusra Front. The Islamic State of Iraq and the Levant then captured it from the al-Nusra Front in April 2014 following the Battle of Markada. The mount is currently under the control of Kurdish YPG forces who captured it in May 2015 from the Islamic State (IS).

== Geography ==
The mountain extends from east to west and has a length of 85 km, a width of 15 km, and an area of 84,050 hectares. Jabal Abdulaziz consists of a series of hills and valleys with heights between 300 and 932 meters. It is the sole topographic elevation in Northeast Syria. The nearest topographic elevation are the Bishri mountains to the south-west. To the east, the Sinjar mountain range begins in Iraq.

== Geology ==
The surroundings of Mount Abdulaziz have been surveyed in view of establishing an oil industry several times. In 1949 the Iraqi Oil Company conducted drillings to the west of the mountain. Through the International Agreement on Economic and Technical Cooperation of 1958 between the Soviet Union and the Syrian Arab Republic (SAR), high ranking soviet geologists mapped the area. Rompetrol of Romania conducted several drillings to collect seismic data in the south of Mount in the 1970s.

== Population ==
In the Ottoman era, the area was transiently populated by nomadic Arab herders who wandered the arid plains between the ridge and the area of Mardin (now in Turkey). With the post-Ottoman establishment of the Syro-Turkish border and the increasing promotion of sedentary agriculture by colonial and state authorities, these tribes began to be forced to permanently settle during the French Mandate, with the first permanent settlement established in the 1950s. As of 2007, there are around twenty villages and thirty smaller farming settlements scattered around the foot of the ridge with a total population of between 13,000 and 15,000 individuals. All of the inhabitants of the area are Arabs of the Baqqarat al-Jabal tribe, save for one village of the Sayyad tribe (which has integrated with the former). It is one of the poorest areas in Syria, largely due to arid conditions and exacerbated by land use restrictions in place around the nature reserve established on the mountain. Many inhabitants have migrated to Hasakah city and the nearby town of Tall Tamer to seek better conditions.

== See also ==
- Sinjar Mountains
