= Western Hasakah offensive =

2015 Kurdish military operation

- Part of the Syrian Civil War, Rojava–Islamist conflict, and the American-led intervention in Syria
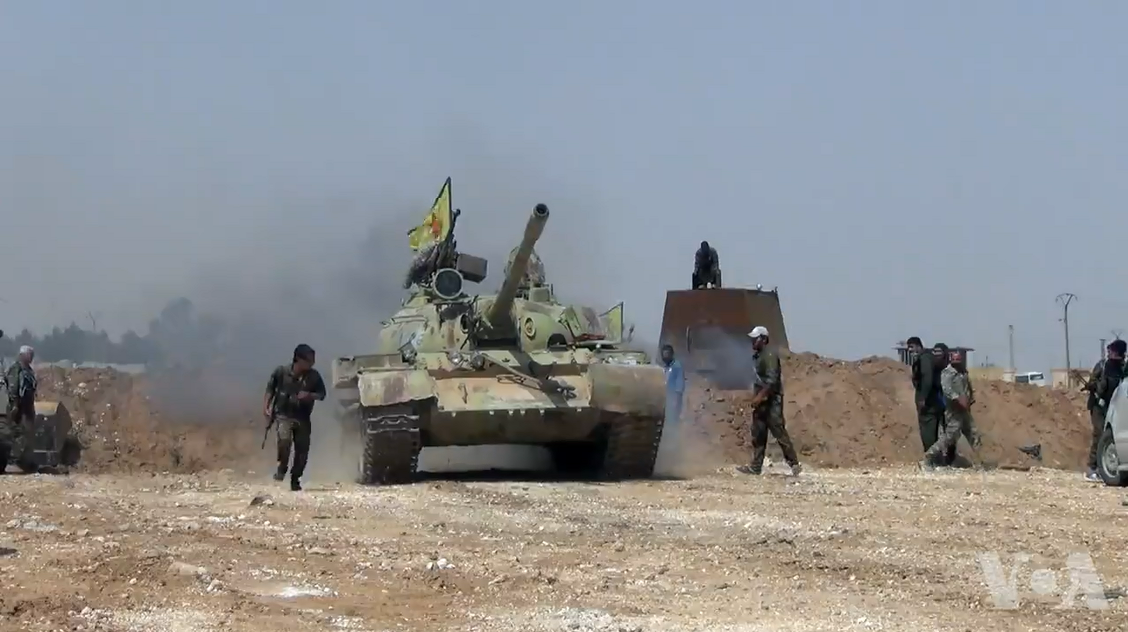
- Top: YPG fighters in Tell Tamer; Bottom: Map of the combined Hasakah and Tell Abyad offensives
| Date | 23 February – 31 May 2015 (3 months, 1 week and 1 day) |
| Location | Western Hasakah Governorate, Syria |
| Result | Major YPG and allied forces victory: ISIL initially captures 35 villages around Tell Tamer and Manajir, and takes 350–400 Assyrian Christian hostages; The YPG and allies recapture all lost territory and expel ISIL from the western Hasakah countryside; Offensive operations in the Ras al-Ayn countryside expand into the Tell Abyad region on 31 May 2015 |
| Territorial changes | The YPG and allied forces capture the Tell Tamer and Ras al-Ayn countrysides, including 230 towns, villages, and farms, as well the Abd al-Aziz Mountains |

Belligerents
| Rojava; Syriac Union Party; Al-Sanadid Forces; Air-strikes: CJTF–OIR | Islamic State |

Commanders and leaders
| Sozdar Dêrik (YPG General Command member); Commander Rûbar Qamishlo † (YPG field commander); Sharwan Sason (YPG field commander) | Abu Ali al-Anbari (Deputy, Syria); Abu Omar al-Shishani (Field commander in Syria; first phase only) |

Units involved
| YPG; YPJ; Syriac Military Council (MFS); Sutoro; Khabour Guards | (Islamic State) Military of ISIL: al-Barakah Province; Khorasan Battalion |

Strength
| (Democratic Autonomous Administration of North and East Syria) YPG & YPJ: 5,500+ Syriac Military Council (MFS): 1,500 Sutoro: 1,000+ (June 2013) | 4,000+ |

Casualties and losses
| 118 killed, 14 executed | 539–821 killed (YPG claim); 268 killed (SOHR claim) |
- 51–121 civilians killed

The Western Hasakah offensive was a military operation in the spring of 2015, waged between the Kurdish YPG and allied forces against the Islamic State (ISIL) for control of the western half of the Hasakah Governorate, during the Syrian Civil War. The Syrian Kurds' counteroffensive was dubbed Operation Commander Rûbar Qamishlo. During the initial ISIL offensive, Islamic State forces managed to advance up to the western banks of the Khabur River, reaching Tell Tamer and Ras al-Ayn, and capturing dozens of villages, in addition to abducting 350–400 Assyrian Christians as hostages. In the subsequent Kurdish-led counteroffensive, the Kurdish-led forces managed to expel Islamic State forces from the western countryside of the Hasakah Governorate, in addition to the Abzulaziz mountain range. On 31 May 2015, as most of the offensive operations in the western Hasakah Governorate ended, the part of the offensive in the Ras al-Ayn District expanded into the Tell Abyad region, in the northern Raqqa Governorate.

== Background ==
On 21 February 2015, the YPG and their allies launched an offensive on ISIL territory in the eastern countryside of the Hasakah Governorate, to expel the Islamic State from the region. On 23 February, the YPG captured Tell Brak, during a pre-dawn raid, and severed the road between Tal Hamis and al-Hawl two days later, which was a main ISIL supply line from Iraq. On 27 February, Kurdish forces managed to capture the town of Tell Hamis and the surrounding area, while the Syrian Army launched their own offensive from the direction of Qamishli. On March 10, the YPG had captured 103 villages and hamlets, in addition to Tell Brak and Tell Hamis, expelling ISIL to the south of the Khabur River.

== The offensive ==
=== Initial ISIL offensive ===
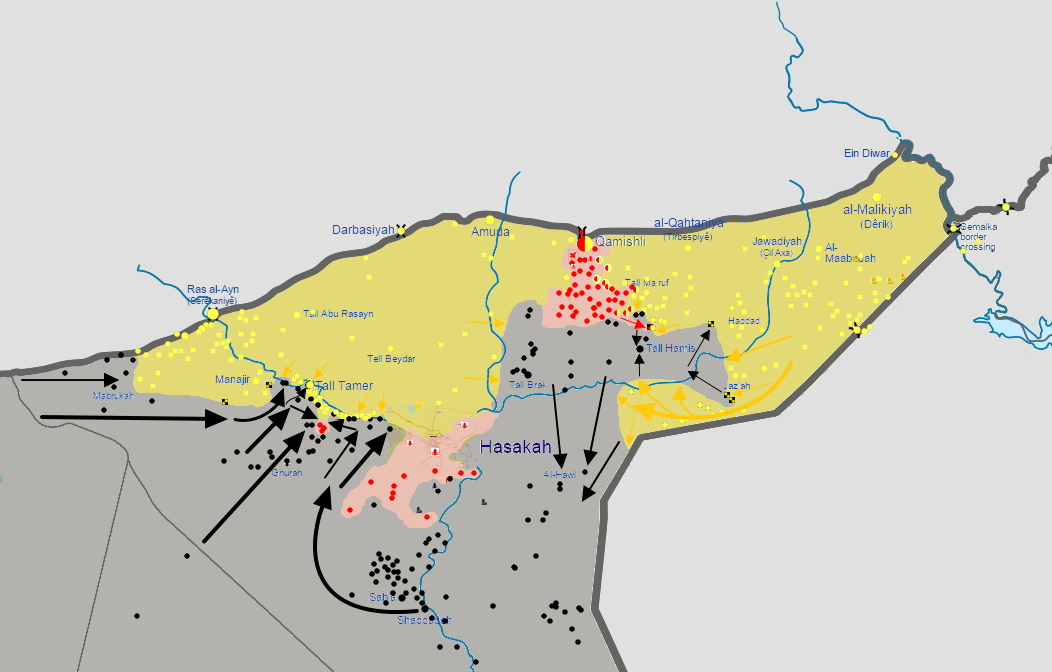
Map of the Hasakah offensive in progress, on 24 February 2015, showing the YPG and ISIL offensives on both sides of the Governorate.

In response to the Kurdish offensive in the eastern Hasakah countryside, on 23 February 2015, ISIL launched a massive attack on a cluster of villages along the southern bank of the Khabur River around the town of Tell Tamer, in the western Hasakah countryside, using around 3,000 fighters and multiple tanks, seizing 11 villages and kidnapping 220 Assyrians by 26 February, according to the SOHR. Local sources stated that 33–35 villages were captured and put the number of abducted Assyrians at 350–400. ISIL was reportedly withdrawing militants from other fronts in Syria, including the front at Homs, to boost their assault at Tell Tamer. The Kurds managed to recapture several of the villages, but the fate of the Assyrians remained unknown. It was also reported that Abu Omar al-Shishani, ISIL's field commander in Syria, was leading the assault at Tell Tamer.

On 28 February, ISIL executed 15 of their Assyrian hostages, 14 of whom were fighters. Another 13 Christian fighters were among those being held. Kurdish-Arab allied forces were continuing to fight ISIL outside Tell Tamer, while the offensive in the eastern Hasakah countryside began drawing to a close. By 3 March, 24 of the Assyrian hostages were released by ISIL. after ransoms were paid.

On 7 March, ISIL launched another massive attack on the villages around Tell Tamer, in an attempt to fully capture the area. Amid the fighting, there were fears that ISIL militants would use the kidnapped Assyrians as human shields. The attack began around dawn and targeted at least three villages on the northern bank of the Khabur River, with ISIL's aim being to capture Tell Tamer and secure another corridor to the Iraqi border. The next day, ISIL advanced close to the town and heavy fighting ensued, but Kurdish reinforcements arrived, and they managed to repel the militants. The clashes left 40 dead on both sides. On 10 March, the YPG reported that their offensive in the eastern countryside of Hasakah had concluded successfully. However, on the same day, ISIL launched a surprise attack on Tell Khanzir, about 30 kilometers to the west of Ras al-Ayn, near the Turkish border in west Hasakah, capturing the town along with several other villages. It was reported that ISIL had deployed hundreds of battle-hardened Chechens from its Khorasan Battalion to carry out the assault. Fierce clashes also erupted in and around Manajir, a town to the northwest of Tell Tamer, as ISIL sought to strike northward. ISIL used the assault to prevent Kurdish forces in the east from reaching their stronghold of al-Hawl, to the southeast, by occupying the Kurds on multiple fronts, attempting to seize another border crossing with Turkey, and due to fears that the Kurds would use Ras al-Ayn as a base to seize control of Tell Abyad, and link the Kobanî and Jazira Cantons. ISIL also wanted control of Ras al-Ayn and Tell Tamer to control additional key routes that would link the ISIL-held Iraqi city of Mosul with other ISIL-controlled territory in northeastern Syria. On 12 March, the Kurds managed to repel the ISIL advance on Ras al-Ayn, resulting in dozens of casualties on both sides. However, ISIL advanced towards Tell Tamer and captured the village of Tal Nasri, bringing the militants to within 500 meters of the town. The fighting near Tell Tamer left 22 Kurdish and 18 jihadist fighters dead.

Two days later, the Kurds recaptured the village of Tal Maghas, near Tell Tamer; however, according to another report, ISIL managed to capture several more villages and crossed the Khabur River, in the area just northwest of Tell Tamer. The YPG demanded more US-led Coalition airstrikes in the region, due to the fact that ISIL was deploying more reinforcements while the Coalition had not conducted any airstrikes near Tell Tamer since 10 March. By this point, since the beginning of the ISIL counterattack on 10 March, the clashes in the Tell Tamer and Tell Khanzir areas had left at least 105 ISIL militants and 63 YPG fighters dead. On 13 March, the US-led Coalition resumed airstrikes in the region.

On 16 March, the YPG advanced and captured some ISIL positions in the countryside around Tell Tamer. The same day, 100 Hezbollah fighters arrived in Ras al-Ayn from Qamishli to support Kurdish forces, according to the pro-opposition Hasakah Youth Union, and were soon after sent to the battlefield where they were outfitted with Kurdish uniforms. The next day, the Iranian Fars News Agency reported that the Syrian Army advanced and captured the town of Malaha, as well as its surrounding farm areas. From 18 to 19 March, US-led Coalition airstrikes struck 3 ISIL tactical units, an ISIL fighting position, and an ISIL tunnel system in the area.

On 20 March, more than 100 people were killed and wounded when an ISIL militant blew himself up at a celebration held by the Kurds for the festival of Nowruz, in the al-Mofti neighborhood of Hasakah city, in addition to an IED explosion at another celebration in the city.

Over the next several days, clashes erupted in the vicinity of Tell Khanzir, Tell Brak and Tell Tamer, killing dozens of ISIL militants, while fighter jets bombed ISIL positions in the city of Al-Shaddadi. Around this point, the offensive stalemated, as ISIL was unable to overrun Kurdish positions around the Tell Tamer and Manajir countrysides.

=== Counteroffensive first phase – Tell Tamer countryside and Mount Abd al-Aziz ===
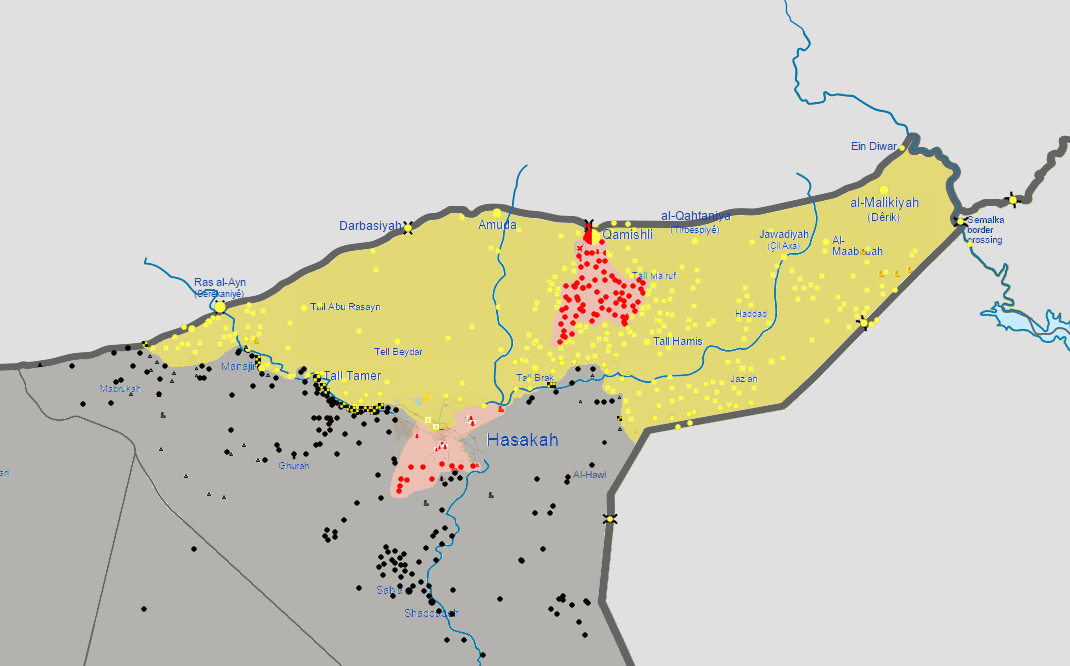
Map of the maximum gains made by ISIL advances during the Eastern Hasakah offensive, by mid-April 2015.

On 6 May 2015, Kurdish forces launched a large-scale counteroffensive in the area of Tell Tamer to recapture territory they had previously lost to the Islamic State, and to push them out of the western Hasakah countryside. Over the next three days, the YPG advanced in the Aalyah area, northwest of Tell Tamer, and elsewhere, while backed up by U.S.-led Coalition air-strikes.

On the fourth day of the offensive, Kurdish Commander Rûbar Qamishlo, for whom the operation was named, was heavily wounded. Commander Qamishlo died of his wounds on 14 May.

On 10 May, the YPG advanced on the road between Tell Tamer and Aleppo. On 11 May, the YPG advanced in the al-Salihiyyi area and continued advancing northwest of Tell Tamer the following day, eventually capturing the Alya area by 13 May.

On 15 May, the YPG, backed up by the Syriac MFS and Khabour Guards, advanced in the Tal Hormoz area, amid continuing fighting and an ISIL car-bomb attack. Two days later, the YPG captured parts of Tal Hormoz amid mutual bombardment by both sides and an ISIL suicide car-bomb attack, while clashes also took place around Razaza village where Coalition air-strikes took place.

On 18 May, the YPG-led forces captured two villages overlooking the road towards Mount Abdulaziz, a mountain range to the south of the Tell Tamer countryside. On the following day, the YPG captured another three villages on the road heading towards the mountain, as ISIL hit them with two suicide car-bombs. In all, between 17 and 19 May, the YPG captured about 20 villages.

On 20 May, the YPG and allied forces captured wide parts of the mountain. In addition, on 21 May, they seized the village of Aghaybesh, located on the road between Qamishli and Aleppo.

On 21 May, Kurdish forces captured the Assyrian villages of Tal Shamira and Tal Nasri, as well as two other villages. Thus, they completed the first stage of their two-week offensive successfully, recapturing Christian villages that ISIL militants took control of three months earlier and seizing Mount Abd al-Aziz.

=== Counteroffensive second phase – Ras al-Ayn countryside ===
On 26 May, the YPG captured the town of Mabrouka, in the border area of Ras al-Ayn, bringing them closer to the ISIL-held border town of Tell Abyad, then a major transit point for ISIL black-market oil commerce and foreign fighters from Turkey.

In all, since 6 May, the YPG and allied forces captured 4,000 square kilometers of territory throughout the western Hasakah Governorate, including 230 towns, villages and farmlands.

After the capture of Mabrouka, the YPG launched attacks on ISIL-held villages on the border. The Kurds claimed that 184 ISIL fighters were killed between 25 and 28 May.

On 29 May, the YPG captured the entire countryside of Ras al-Ayn, as they continued the second phase of their campaign. Later that day, clashes on the administrative boundary between Hasakah and Raqqa provinces took place that left 30 civilians dead at Nis Tal, on the Syrian–Turkish border, according to SOHR. In contrast, Kurdish sources claimed nearly 100 people were massacred. The civilians were killed by ISIL while trying to escape an advance by the jihadists. Meanwhile, the Kurds executed 20 civilians on the charges of supporting ISIL and burned and demolished homes of suspected ISIL supporters near Tell Tamer and Ras al-Ayn.

On 31 May 2015, Kurdish forces pushed beyond the provincial boundary between the Hasakah and Raqqa Governorates, thus ending the offensive operations within the western Hasakah Governorate.

== Aftermath ==
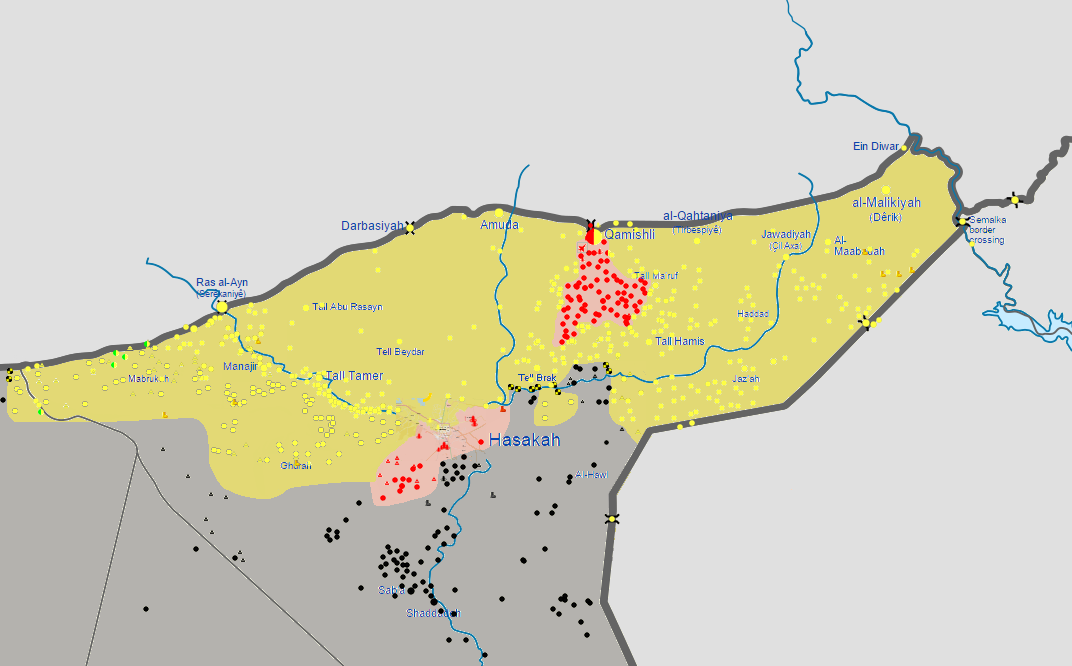
Map of the territorial changes in the Hasakah Governorate, after the conclusion of the YPG-led counterattack phase of the Hasakah offensive, on 31 May 2015

On 30 May, ISIL launched an offensive towards the Syrian government-controlled part of Hasakah, and advanced in the city's outskirts after two suicide bombers targeted Syrian Army positions, killing and wounding 50 soldiers. The offensive originated from the ISIL-held town of Al-Shaddadah, south of Hasakah, and was the jihadist organizations's third assault on the city in 2015. On 31 May, Kurdish forces seized four villages on the provincial boundary between Hasakah and Raqqa. The SOHR also reported that clashes were continuing between YPG and ISIL forces to the southwest of Ras al-Ayn.

On 8 June, the ISIL offensive ended in failure, and they withdrew.

On 23 June 2015, ISIL launched a full-scale offensive to seize control of Hasakah city, storming the Syrian Government-held southern districts of the city. On 1 August 2015, following more than 5 weeks of large-scale urban warfare, and heavy intervention by the YPG and the US-led Coalition, the Kurdish-led forces and the Syrian Government fully expelled the Islamic State from Hasakah city and its surrounding countryside,

On 15 July 2015, an ISIL militant attempted to carry out a suicide attack in the area between Tell Brak and al-Hawl; however, he was captured by the YPG, and the explosives were disarmed.

On 17 July, three ISIL militants attacked the village of Nestal, to the west of the town of Mabrouka. One of the militants was reportedly killed, while another fled across the border into Turkey.

On 8 August 2015, ISIL militants carried out an attack on the village of Abu Hamal, to the south of Tell Hamis. The YPG and YPJ counterattacked, forcing ISIL to withdraw from the region.

On 10 October 2015, the YPG and their Arab allies merged into a single organization, the Syrian Democratic Forces (SDF). Subsequently, the SDF went on to launch further offensives on ISIL's last 2 Hasakah Governorate strongholds of al-Hawl and Al-Shaddadi, with the SDF taking al-Hawl and the surrounding area by 30 November 2015, and taking al-Shaddadi and its countryside by 24 February 2016. Towards the end of the offensive on Al-Shaddadi, on 22 February 2016, the Islamic State released the last 42 survivors of their 400 Assyrian Christian hostages, after they had spent nearly a year in captivity.

== See also ==
- Autonomous Administration of North and East Syria
- Rojava conflict
- American-led intervention in Iraq (2014–present)
- List of wars and battles involving ISIL
- Siege of Kobanî
- Battle of Sarrin (June–July 2015)
- Palmyra offensive (May 2015)
- October 7 attack – A terrorist attack by another terrorist group that also saw hundreds of civilians abducted
