= Qalamoun offensive (May–June 2015) =

Military operation of the Syrian Civil War

Coordinates: 33.9600°N 36.3620°E

- Part of the Hezbollah involvement in the Syrian Civil War and the Syrian Civil War spillover in Lebanon
- Battle of Western Qalamoun (2013–2017) Syrian Government & Hezbollah control Lebanese Government & Hezbollah control Syrian Opposition control For a war map of the current situation in Rif Dimashq, see here.
Date	4 May – 21 June 2015 (1 month, 2 weeks and 3 days)
Location	Qalamoun Mountains, Syria and Lebanon
Result	Pro-Syrian government victory: Pro-Syrian government troops capture most of the mountainous border region and push the rebels to the outskirts of Arsal

Belligerents
(Syria) Syrian Arab Republic; Hezbollah; Amal Movement	Army of Conquest; Al-Nusra Front; Islamic Front; Free Syrian Army; Islamic State (limited cooperation with al-Nusra Front until 12 May; in conflict since 12 May)

Commanders and leaders
Gen. Ghassan; Col. Median; Ali Khalil Alian †; Marwan Mughniyeh †	Abu Maria Al-Qahtani; Abu al-Malik al-Talli (Al-Nusra Emir of Qalamoun); Abu Massab; Abu Sahib (Islamic State) Abu al-Walid al-Maqdisi (ISIL Emir of Qalamoun) (Islamic State) Abu Balqis al-Baghdadi † (Islamic State) Abdullah al-Iraqi (POW) (Islamic State) Abu al-Baraa (POW)

Units involved
Syrian Armed Forces; Syrian Army; 1st Armoured Division; 3rd Armoured Division; Republican Guard; Qalamoun Shield Forces; National Defence Forces	Unknown

Strength
6,500 soldiers 2,250 militiamen	1,500–4,000 militants 1,500 militants

Casualties and losses
75 killed	244–300 militants killed (pro-Syrian gov. claim); 42+ militants killed (SOHR claim) (Islamic State) 48 militants killed (Islamic State) 47 militants captured

The Qalamoun offensive (May–June 2015) was an offensive led by the Iranian-backed Shia militia Hezbollah, supported by the Syrian Arab Army, during the Syrian civil war, against Sunni Islamist al-Nusra Front and other Syrian opposition forces entrenched in the mountains of the Qalamoun region.

== Background ==
In mid-November 2013, the Syrian military, backed by Hezbollah, launched an offensive against the rebel-held Qalamoun Mountains in an attempt to cut rebel supply lines to Damascus from Lebanon. The strategic region had been used by rebel forces as a rear base for its operations around the capital Damascus. The battle was primarily led on the rebel side by al-Nusra Front. By late April 2014, the last major rebel stronghold in the region fell to the Syrian Army, as it secured all of the towns in the region. However, 3,000 rebels retreated into the mountains to conduct guerrilla hit-and-run attacks.

From June through August 2014, a new Syrian government offensive against remnant rebel forces led to the rebels coming under siege. Over the following months, al- Front and the Islamic State of Iraq and the Levant maintained a foothold in the region's rugged terrain. Over 20 FSA factions merged into the Gathering of Western Qalamoun group, while by the end of the year, six eastern Qalamoun FSA brigades formed the Mujahideen Shura Council. At the same time, the arrival of an ISIL expeditionary force lead to a wave of FSA defections into ISIL numbering in the hundreds, further boosting the Islamic State's presence in the region, which reached approximately 1,000 fighters. Al- Front maintained 600 militants in Qalamoun's eastern areas, forging an alliance with ISIL in the region.

== The offensive ==
=== Prelude ===
Between 25 and 28 March 2015, the Syrian Army and Hezbollah captured two hills near the town of Flitah and several others in the Zabadani region. The fighting left 30 rebels dead. The Lebanese Army seized some positions on the outskirts of Arsal from jihadist fighters. By 3 April, the Syrian military had advanced on three axes towards Zabadani, securing the western and eastern approaches to the city, and relatively paralyzing the defending rebels. Fifteen al-Nusra Front fighters attempting to reinforce the rebels in Zabadani were killed trying to breach the cordon.

In mid-April, opposition forces captured a strategic hill overlooking Flita that had been held by Hezbollah fighters. At this time, Hezbollah was preparing for a new offensive, considered to be a decisive battle for Qalamoun, while the rebels were making efforts to unite different warring opposition groups in an effort to take control of the Qalamoun region. However, ISIL and al-Nusra Front were still competing to win over communities in the Arsal area and the rebels in both Zabadani's mountains range and in the Anti-Lebanon Mountains switched from offense to defense. They were preparing trenches, tunnels, bunkers, and barricades, in anticipation of a possible battle in the spring.

On the morning on 25 April 2015, explosions targeted the Brigade 155 (main Syrian Scud missile-base) and Brigade 65 bases in Qalamoun. Two weapons convoys were also targeted, reportedly killing one person. According to an opposition source, the targets were Hezbollah camps and ammo storages within the two bases. Several explosions were heard in the areas of Kteife, Yabrud and a village in Qalamoun. Plumes of smoke were seen above the Brigade 65 base, shortly after the strikes.

According to conflicting sources, the attack was attributed to a ground attack by al-Nusra Front, or an air operation of the Israeli Air Force. Unprecedently, unlike previous cases of no comment, Israeli official sources denied any involvement of Israeli forces in the incident.

=== Operations begin ===
Syrian Army self-propelled howitzers firing during operations in Qalamoun

Early on 4 May, al-Nusra Front and allied Islamists launched a preemptive attack against SAA and Hezbollah forces, and by the next day captured several positions. The aim of the assault was to capture the border-crossing into Lebanon near Assal al-Ward. At the same time, Hezbollah ambushed an al-Nusra Front convoy near Tfail, killing 15 and wounding 30 militants.

On the morning of 6 May, heavy fighting erupted along the border near Assal al-Ward. On 7 May, Hezbollah launched a series of limited and quick operations from the Lebanese side of the border, while Syrian Army operations commenced from the Syrian side. Two days after the fighting at Assad al-Ward started, the Syrian Army and Hezbollah seized control of a number of hilltops overlooking Assal al-Ward, reportedly killing dozens of rebels and securing the town. Hezbollah fighters advancing from Assal al-Ward linked up with fighters coming from the outskirts of the Lebanese village of Brital. In addition, government forces separated rebels at Zabadani from those in the mountains, severing their logistical lines, and putting both under separate blockades.

On 9 May, a military source claimed government forces captured three villages in the Jour Al-'Anib area.

Rebels abandoned their camps in a hurry in the face of the Hezbollah advance and left groceries, medicines and other supplies which littered their camps. Thousands of retreating rebels were expected to flee towards the Lebanese town of Arsal, after pulling back first to the outskirts of Ras al-Maara. The withdrawing militants also reportedly left behind 150 heavy machine guns (from 12.7 to 23 mm caliber) and anti-tank rockets (firing range from 3.5 to 5 kilometers). The quick collapse and retreat of some 2,000 al-Nusra Front fighters was attributed to a "lack of sufficient experience in direct fighting", according to a Salafi sheikh who maintained contacts with al-Nusra Front and ISIL.

On 11 May, the Army and Hezbollah captured Al-Barouh hill outside Al-Juba, taking total control of the outskirts of the village, and seized the border-crossing at Ma'br Al-Kharbah. In addition, military sources reported government troops captured five small villages in the region. Hezbollah advances were also confirmed by the pro-opposition SOHR group.

Despite the fighting taking place over the previous week, an all-out battle had reportedly not yet started, with some predictions of it happening in the second half of the month. ISIL forces, entrenched six kilometers away near Arsal, had also not yet joined the fighting. However, ISIL commanders from Iraq were reportedly brought in for the upcoming battle with Hezbollah.

On 12 May, al-Nusra Front and its allies vowed to "eradicate" ISIL in the Qalamoun region, after ISIL reportedly "betrayed" their rebel allies and attacked several of their bases in the border area, as well as blocking rebel transport routes. According to Mario Abou Zeid from Beirut's Carnegie Middle East Center, Syrian Intelligence directed its operatives within ISIL in Qalamoun to launch probing skirmishes against FSA forces to test their defenses, and in an attempt to distract them from the main battle.

Meanwhile, the Syrian Army and Hezbollah reportedly seized more areas between Ras al-Maara and the Lebanese village of Nahleh. During their operations, Hezbollah used unmanned drones. According to the SOHR, eight Hezbollah militants were killed in the Qalamoun mountains between 11 and 12 May. The retreating rebels were reportedly concentrated on the mountain's highest hilltop, Tallat Mussa. Still, the day's fighting was lighter due to intermittent rainfall and fog.

=== Capture of Tallat Mussa ===
On 13 May, the Syrian Army and Hezbollah took full control of Tallat Mussa after capturing at least nine rebel positions during heavy exchanges of artillery and rocket fire along the ridge between Al-Juba, Ras al-Maara and Assal al-Ward. Earlier in the day, Army troops, backed up by Hezbollah, seized half of the outskirts of Ras al-Maara and advanced toward the highlands of Jabal al-Barouh which is linked to Tallat Mussa. Surviving rebel fighters were pushed towards the outskirts of Arsal. The night of the assault on Tallat Mussa, temperatures reached zero degrees Celsius as it rained and hailed. Before taking the mountain top, Syrian Army soldiers had to climb up the slopes under heavy mortar and sniper fire. According to the SOHR, 36 rebels, 18 Hezbollah and 13 NDF fighters were killed during the fighting, while Lebanese security sources put the death toll at 53 rebels and four Hezbollah fighters. The capture of the hilltop was described by Elijah J. Magnier as the beginning of the long-announced battle. The Syrian Army also claimed to have captured the hills of al-Jerafah, Sin al-Sakhrey, al-Reya, Ouqbet al-Faseh, and all of the barrens of Ras al-Maara.

=== Fighting for the Jubbah Heights and Tal Thaljah ===
On the next day, Hezbollah swept areas around Tallat Mussa for any remaining pockets of rebels, as it entered the final stage of the offensive. Hezbollah clashed with militants at Jabal al-Barouh, while it took control of the Ras al-Marra-Arsal border-crossing, which was the last border entry into Qalamoun from Lebanon, as well as Dahr al-Hawa Hill, which overlooks Arsal and Younin. In addition, the SAA and NDF launched an attack on al-Nusra Front reinforcements coming from the Jubbah Heights. On the same day, ISIL and al-Nusra Front engaged in fierce clashes along the Lebanese side of the border, after ISIL attempted to infiltrate al-Nusra Front positions in al-Zamarani and Wadi Ajram. ISIL's first attack wave around 5 P.M. was repelled by heavy artillery fire, but in the evening, ISIL launched a second attack that led to fierce fighting. The second attack was also eventually repelled, with ISIL fighters retreating to the north.

On 15 May, Hezbollah captured Jabal al-Barouh. In the evening, al-Nusra Front's frontline at Ras Al-Marra reportedly collapsed, after Hezbollah, in coordination with the SAA and NDF, captured the Ras Al-Marra barrens. In addition, Jabal Al-'Arteez was also seized. A victory speech by the Hezbollah leader Hassan Nasrallah was announced for the following day to mark the end of the offensive.

On 16 May, Nasrallah said that Hezbollah had managed to expel rebel forces from Qalamoun, but that the battle for the region continued, since opposition fighters continued to be entrenched in certain areas. During the day, after reaching a "point of desperation", al-Nusra Front attacked and recaptured the Ras al-Marra border-crossing, after which it assaulted Tallat Mussa but was repelled.

On the next day, the Syrian Army and Hezbollah reportedly reached the area of al-Fakhte, on the eastern outskirts of Arsal, while rebel fighters were fortifying their positions at the Jubbah Heights, in preparation for an attack in the coming days. The Lebanese Army also shelled rebel positions near Arsal to prevent any possible attacks, after fears that retreating rebel fighters would regroup near Arsal grew, after they had withdrawn towards the outskirts of Flita and Ras al-Maara.

On 19 May, the SAA and Hezbollah captured the Flita barrens and the Flita-Arsal border-crossing, which al-Nusra Front captured the previous week. Following this advance, government troops started to prepare for the final assault on the heavily fortified Jubbah Heights. According to the Hezbollah-run Al-Manar TV, the offensive had destroyed or dismantled 40 rebel bases and four operations rooms, with only one operations room remaining near Flita. On 20 May, the Syrian Army and Hezbollah captured a number of hilltops on the southern outskirts of Flita. Some rebels retreated toward Arsal, while others fled toward Jarajeer.

On 21 May, the Army and Hezbollah advanced further, capturing additional peaks and fully besieging al-Nusra Front in a small portion of the mountains, as they were in full control of all of the border crossings in the Qalamoun region by this point and had regained 310 out of 780 square kilometers of Lebanese and Syrian territory seized by rebels. Two days later, Al-Manar reported the Army and Hezbollah had captured the Sadr al-Bustan hilltop.

On 25 May, Hezbollah and the 20th and 128th Brigades of the 1st Armored Division captured the western hills of Tal Thaljah, after al-Nusra Front made an attempt to counterattack the advancing Syria government forces on the hilltop, but was repelled. The battle for Tal Thaljah was the bloodiest for Hezbollah with six of their fighters dead as they fought uphill with no air cover due to bad weather. With this advance, government forces were in nearly total control of the Qalamoun Mountains on the Syrian side of the Syria-Lebanon border, and thus concluded their offensive. Afterwards, the Syrian Army and Hezbollah began redeploying their forces to the city of Al-Zabdani, to the southwest of the region. On 29 May, pro-government Al-Masdar News reported that the Syrian Army and Hezbollah had captured 90% of the Qalamoun Mountains, with the remaining 10% located on the Lebanese side of the Syria-Lebanon border and under ISIL control.

=== Hezbollah advances at Arsal, Flita and Jarajeer ===
On 30 May, clashes renewed between Hezbollah, backed by Syrian troops and NDF, against rebel fighters in the mountains.

On 3 June, Hezbollah reportedly captured three hilltops east of Arsal and were advancing towards a strategic peak. Four days later, Syrian Army and Hezbollah forces made advances in the Flita countryside and the western barrens of Qalamoun, taking control of several strategic areas and pushing the rebels out of the Flita area. Pro-government troops captured Al-Hamra-Qusair crossing, which links Flita and Arsal. Retreating rebels were forced to flee to an ISIL-controlled area. Meanwhile, Hezbollah fighters reportedly captured several peaks in the outskirts of Arsal, with al-Nusra Front fighters withdrawing to a Syrian refugee camp and an amusement park in Wadi al-Hosn. Syrian Army and Hezbollah advances in the western rocky barrens continued the next day, as they captured the strategic hill that overlooks Jaroud Jarajeer at Qurnah Shab'ah. They then overpowered the retreating rebels at Wadi Al-Khashiyah, forcing them to withdraw from the Jaroud Jarajeer valley.

On 9 June, Hezbollah came into conflict, for the first time since the start of the offensive, with ISIL militants. The fighting started early in the morning when ISIL launched a surprise attack on four Hezbollah posts on the outskirts of Ras Baalbek. 48 militants and eight Hezbollah fighters were killed. The next day, Nasrallah stated the Syrian Army and Hezbollah were in control of the major parts of the mountain range, after defeating al-Nusra Front, and had begun a battle against ISIL. The same day, Hezbollah made more advances in the Qalamoun wastelands against al-Nusra Front, specifically towards the outskirts of Jarajeer, as nine of their fighters were killed.

As of 13 June, al-Nusra Front fighters were surrounded in the outskirts of Arsal. Fighting also continued near Jarajeer, where Hezbollah captured the Shmeis al-Hsan Heights. On 16 June, Hezbollah secured the areas of Tallet Ras Al-Kosh and Qornat Ras Al-Shabah on the outskirts of Jarajeer, which were the last remaining rebel-held hills in that area.

As of 21 June, the battle for the Qalamoun mountains had concluded, with only a small area remaining under rebel control. ISIL and al-Nusra Front fighters continued to hold the Jaroud Qarah area on the Syrian side of the border and the Arsal barrens on the Lebanese side. With the majority of operations ending, Syrian Army and Hezbollah units started to redeploy to the Zabadani front.

== Aftermath ==
On 23 June, the 20th and 128th Brigades of the Syrian Army's 1st Armored Division, in coordination with Hezbollah and the NDF, advanced to the Jaroud Qarah area and launched an assault on ISIL defensive positions, which was the last ISIL-controlled part of the Qalamoun mountains in Syria.

On 4 July, Hezbollah and the Syrian Army launched an offensive against Zabadani and by 15 July, they were advancing towards the town's center and had effectively encircled rebel forces in Zabadani.

On 24 September, a ceasefire was signed between the warring parties upon which the rebels would withdraw from Al-Zabadani within a six-month period, while surrendering all heavy weaponry. The agreement would be overseen by the United Nations office in Damascus.

After the implementation of the ceasefire, the besieging Hezbollah and the SAA troops redirected their attention towards the remaining parts of the Qalamoun Mountains still under rebel control, namely a smaller area in the Jaroud Rankous, located in southern Qalamoun, and larger area located in Jaroud Qarah, in northern Qalamoun. The Hezbollah also set itself out to recapture the Lebanese border-district of Arsal, from where al-Nusra Front and ISIL have been receiving much of its reinforcement into the Qalamoun Mountains.

== Strategic analysis ==
Sami Nader, a professor in politics at the University of Saint Joseph in Lebanon stated regarding Iranian and Hezbollah involvement in the offensive; "they are in desperate need for an achievement to counter balance their losses; they need to sell it to their constituents in order to justify the continuing battle and involvement in Syria" adding that "Qalamoun is more of a media campaign than a real battle on the ground". Hezbollah media relations chief Mohammed Afif stated regarding the Qalamoun fighting "this was a media battle in the first regard", and for the first time Western Media outlets were invited to report on a Hezbollah offensive, including; CNN, BBC News, The New York Times and The Wall Street Journal among others.

Hezbollah analyst and author Nick Blanford stated that Hezbollah needed to show that "this is not our Vietnam, we are winning this war, we are defending the borders of Lebanon", concluding that Hezbollah alone was not enough to prop up the government any longer. The Washington Institute for Near East Policy agreed with this assessment by stating that "even his [Assad's] most reliable Shiite allies may not be able to sustain him as the war's attrition increasingly highlights his demographic disadvantage". In the opinion of Jeffrey White from WINEP, the Syrian Arab Army played a strictly supportive role in the fighting.

== Reactions ==
=== Foreign reactions ===
- Iran – Iranian foreign affairs adviser to supreme leader Ayatollah Ali Khamenei, Ali Akbar Velayati, stated that "We are filled with pride and appreciation when we see that in recent days, the valiant Lebanese resistance (Hezbollah) has achieved great progress and excellent victories alongside the brave Syrian army," adding "We believe this will strengthen the axis of resistance, not just in Syria and Lebanon, but in the whole region".

== See also ==
- Al-Hasakah offensive (May 2015)
- Palmyra offensive (2015)
- Battle of Yarmouk Camp (2015)
- Hama and Homs offensive (March–April 2015)
- Al-Hasakah offensive (February–March 2015)
- Military intervention against ISIL
  - American-led intervention in Syria
- List of wars and battles involving ISIL
