= 26 June 2015 Islamist attacks =

Terrorist attacks in France, Kuwait, Syria, Somalia and Tunisia

26 June 2015 terrorist attacks
- Location: 45.6428°N 5.1250°E; Saint-Quentin-Fallavier, France; Kuwait City, Kuwait; Sousse, Tunisia; Kobanî, Syria; Al-Hasakah, Syria; Leego, Somalia
- Date: 25–26 June 2015
- Deaths: 879+ (not including attackers)
- Injuries: 2344+
- Perpetrators: Islamic State of Iraq and the Levant; Al-Shabaab

On 26 June 2015, attacks occurred in France, Kuwait, and Tunisia, one day following a deadly massacre in Syria. The day of the attacks was dubbed "Bloody Friday" by Anglophone media and "Black Friday" (French: Vendredi Noir) among Francophone media in Europe and North Africa.

One attack at a Tunisian beach resort killed 39; a bombing at a Shia mosque in Kuwait City killed 27 and injured several; while in Kobanî a large-scale massacre by ISIL resulted in more than 223 civilians murdered, in line with over 79 assailants (including 13 suicide bombers) and 23 Kurdish militiamen, dubbed the second-largest massacre by ISIL since summer 2014; a suicide bombing by ISIL in Al-Hasakeh, also in Syria, resulted in 20 fatalities; al-Shabaab militants killed 70 African Union soldiers from Burundi in Leego, Somalia; finally, one man was decapitated, while several were injured during the Saint-Quentin-Fallavier attack in France.

Islamic State of Iraq and the Levant senior leader Abu Mohammad al-Adnani had released an audio message three days earlier encouraging militants everywhere to attack during the month of Ramadan. ISIL also claimed responsibility for the attacks in Tunisia, Syria and Kuwait.

According to The Guardian, there is no evidence that the attacks were coordinated among the perpetrators, but their timing on a single day received significant coverage. One security analyst said the attacks added up to "an unprecedented day for terrorism." In total, more than 403 people died and 336 were injured, not including any attackers involved.

== Background ==
On 7 June, the Institute for the Study of War released a statement predicting that simultaneous terror attacks would take place at around 29 June, marking the one-year anniversary of the terrorist group ISIL declaring itself to be a state. The statement noted that the ISIL's precursor organization Al-Qaeda in Iraq (AQI) had a history of elevating violence during Ramadan. The paper said that ISIL was "likely preparing a surge of operations" during Ramadan to stoke regional sectarian and religious war, and to create military momentum. The paper argued that AQI had a history of promoting sectarian violence though the 2006 al-Askari mosque bombing, and that ISIL would use the movement of religious pilgrims during Ramadan to infiltrate soldiers into Shi'a areas, and also "likely target Shi’a populations outside of Iraq and Syria, particularly in Yemen and Saudi Arabia and possibly further abroad."

Three days before the attack, ISIL's Abu Mohammad al-Adnani called on jihadists to "make the month of Ramadan a calamity on the apostates" by initiating attacks and seeking "martyrdom". The three attacks in France, Kuwait and Tunisia were launched early on Friday morning.

== Question of coordination of the attacks ==
The attacks took place three days before the one-year anniversary of ISIL declaring itself a caliphate on 29 June 2014. Writing for The Guardian, journalist Kareem Shaheen wrote that, "There was no evidence that the near-simultaneous attacks were coordinated, but they highlighted the growing threat of attacks by jihadists, some of them inspired by Isis rhetoric, across Europe, Africa and the Middle East." British professor Sajjan Gohel, the international security director for the Asia-Pacific Foundation think tank, said the attacks added up to "an unprecedented day for terrorism," and that while details of the planning were still unclear, it involved individuals "buying into the ... doctrine that groups like ISIS articulate." They also occurred on Friday, during the Islamic holy month of Ramadan, following an ISIL leader's call to make the month of Ramadan a time of "calamity for the infidels."

Journalist Vivienne Walt wrote for Time that the attacks in France, Kuwait and Syria left "an impression that the group had adopted a new tactic of launching punitive external attacks rather than just focusing on state-building and territorial acquisition." The three attacks plus the killings in Kobanî "do not appear to have any military purpose and may suggest that ISIS has decided to pursue its war for territory in tandem with its war against the world of unbelievers, which includes almost everyone," Walt wrote.

=== Long-term impact ===
On 27 June, Politico reported that U.S. intelligence agencies were reassessing their previous characterization of ISIL as a “regional threat.” In a February 2015 report, Director of National Intelligence James R. Clapper classified ISIL as a "regional threat" and wrote: “In an attempt to strengthen its self-declared caliphate, ISIL probably plans to conduct operations against regional allies, Western facilities, and personnel in the Middle East.” U.S. Congressman Ed Royce, the chairman of the U.S. House Committee on Foreign Affairs, told Politico, “These attacks show that the [ISIL] threat is spreading well beyond Iraq and Syria. A continued safe-haven there means more attacks across the region, Europe and even here at home.... We also must destroy the online messaging that attracts so many young people with the counter message that [ISIL] offers no peace, no community, and no future.”

== Attacks ==
=== Kobanî ===
On 25 June, ISIL fighters launched an attack on the Kurdish-held town of Kobanî, Syria, infiltrating the city en-masse and killing scores of civilians with guns and a series of suicide bombs. The attacks resulted in over 230 civilians dead, as well as 79 ISIL assailants and 23 YPG militia men. It was named the second largest civilian massacre by ISIL since it declared itself a caliphate on 29 June 2014.

=== Saint-Quentin-Fallavier ===
On 26 June, Islamist delivery driver Yassine Salhi decapitated a man and rammed a company van into gas cylinders at a gas factory near Lyon, causing an explosion and injuring two others. Three other people, including Salhi's wife and sister, were later arrested.

=== Kuwait City ===
A suicide bombing took place on 26 June in Kuwait at a Shia mosque killing 27 people. The attack was claimed by ISIL. The Emir of Kuwait visited the location of the incident minutes after it happened. The Islamic State of Iraq and the Levant (ISIL) claimed responsibility for the attack, and identified the perpetrator as "Abu Sulaiman al-Muwahhid". On 14 September, the court ruled that 15 out of 29 suspects had been found guilty, with seven receiving death sentences (five in absentia).

=== Sousse ===
The Sousse attacks occurred on 26 June in the Tunisian town of Sousse. At least 39 people, mostly European tourists, were killed when an armed gunman attacked two hotels on the beach. ISIL claimed responsibility for the attack. Reports have since surfaced of alleged involvement and co-operation between the gunmen Seifeddine Rezgui and Ansar al-Sharia in Tunisia.

=== Leego ===
On 26 June, al-Shabaab militants attacked an African Union Mission to Somalia (AMISOM) base in the Leego district of Somalia and killed more than 70 African Union soldiers. The militants seized control of the military base. Somali and AMISOM troops reportedly retook the base and town on 28 June while al-Shabaab withdrew and offered no resistance to them, but not before beheading the local deputy district commissioner among the captives they took.

== See also ==
- January 2015 Île-de-France attacks
- Charlie Hebdo shooting
- November 2015 Paris attacks
