= Qasrik =

Qasrik (Persian: قصريك) may refer to:

- Qasrik, Salmas
- Qasrik-e Olya, Salmas County
- Qasrik-e Sofla, Salmas County
- Qasrik, Urmia
- Qasrik, Beradust, Urmia County
- Qasrik, Silvaneh, Urmia County
- Qasrik, Sumay-ye Jonubi, Urmia County
