= Ottoman invasion of Persia (1906) =

An Ottoman invasion of Iran took place in 1906 on the orders of the vali of Baghdad. Iran was then under the rule of the Qajar dynasty. The invasion of Persia by the Ottoman Empire occurred during the Persian Constitutional Revolution, and the Ottoman troops were driven out by Russian troops prior to World War I.

Iran would maintain its neutrality during World War I, but that did not prevent the state from being of interest to both the British and the Russians and therefore of strategic importance to the Ottoman Empire. On 23 May, the Ottomans began their occupation of Iran by occupying Behik in Bradest. By the end of May, Ottoman troops occupied parts of Dasht and Mergaver districts but not the settlement of Mergaver itself. By 13 June, the Ottomans had occupied Serdasht and Bani. Citizens of Khanavin were forced to take Ottoman passports and enlist in the Ottoman Army. Five hundred mounted Ottoman troops marched from Baneh into the Persian Luristan country and the districts of Seifi, Malkhatavi and Baghasi and burned crops along the way.

On 24 August, after protests were given by the Iranian government, the Ottoman commander at Ban said he had no order to withdraw, and two days later, the Ottomans were collecting taxes near Urmia. On 8 September, the Ottomans occupied Gangatchin and the district of Baradost. Ottoman troops subsequently occupied a strip of territory extending from a point south-west of Soujboulak to a point west of Khoi. On 3 August 1907, Mergaver was occupied, and three days later the Ottomans threatened Urmia.

From 1906 to 1911, the Ottomans, in concert with local Kurdish allies, continued their efforts. Heavy-handed rule by Mohammad Ali Shah Qajar weakened Persia internally, and the continued interest from the British encouraged the Ottomans to maintain control of the territory, especially as the British wanted to prevent Russian access to the Mediterranean. The Ottomans were eventually expelled from Iran by the Imperial Russian Army in 1911.
