= Zula, Iran =

Neighborhood in West Azerbaijan province, Iran

Zula Persian: زولا
- Neighborhood
- Location within Iran
- Coordinates: 38°05′54″N 44°37′44″E
- Country: Iran
- Province: West Azerbaijan
- County: Salmas
- District: Kuhsar
- Rural District: Chahriq
- Village: Zula Bahik

Population (2006)
  - Total: 225
- Time zone: UTC+3:30 (IRST)

Zula (Persian: زولا) (Note: Also romanized as Zūlā; also known as Zolā) is a neighborhood in the village of Zula Bahik in Chahriq Rural District of Kuhsar District in Salmas County, West Azerbaijan province, Iran.

== History ==
After the 2006 National Census, Zula was merged with the village of Bahik to form the new village of Zula Bahik.

== Demographics ==
=== Population ===
At the time of the 2006 census, Zula's population was 225 in 42 households, when it was a village in Chahriq Rural District.
