= Guzik =

Guzik (Persian: گوزيك) may refer to:

== Places ==
- Guzik, Shenetal
- Guzik, Shepiran

== People ==
- Guzik (surname), surname
