= Balqazan =

Balqazan بلقزن
- Village
- Location within Iran
- Coordinates: 38°03′51″N 44°33′06″E
- Country: Iran
- Province: West Azerbaijan
- County: Salmas
- Bakhsh: Kuhsar
- Rural District: Chahriq

Population (2006)
  - Total: 204
- Time zone: UTC+3:30 (IRST)
  - Summer (DST): UTC+4:30 (IRDT)

Balqazan (Persian: بلقزن, also Romanized as Balqazān; also known as Barqazan and Barqazan) is a village in Chahriq Rural District, Kuhsar District, Salmas County, West Azerbaijan Province, Iran. At the 2006 census, its population was 204, in 42 families.
