= Lakabad-e Olya =

Lakabad-e Olya لك ابادعليا
- Village
- Location within Iran
- Coordinates: 38°02′52″N 44°34′02″E
- Country: Iran
- Province: West Azerbaijan
- County: Salmas
- Bakhsh: Kuhsar
- Rural District: Chahriq

Population (2006)
  - Total: 97
- Time zone: UTC+3:30 (IRST)
  - Summer (DST): UTC+4:30 (IRDT)

Lakabad-e Olya (Persian: لك ابادعليا, also Romanized as Lakābād-e ‘Olyā; also known as Lakābād) is a village in Chahriq Rural District, Kuhsar District, Salmas County, West Azerbaijan Province, Iran. At the 2006 census, its population was 97, in 14 families.
