= Darmandek =

Darmandek درماندك
- Village
- Location within Iran
- Coordinates: 38°00′08″N 44°31′51″E
- Country: Iran
- Province: West Azerbaijan
- County: Salmas
- Bakhsh: Kuhsar
- Rural District: Chahriq

Population (2006)
  - Total: 103
- Time zone: UTC+3:30 (IRST)
  - Summer (DST): UTC+4:30 (IRDT)

Darmandek (Persian: درماندك, also Romanized as Darmāndek; also known as Darmānderīk and Dīlmānderīk) is a village in Chahriq Rural District, Kuhsar District, Salmas County, West Azerbaijan Province, Iran. At the 2006 census, its population was 103, in 16 families.
