= Yunjaliq =

Yunjaliq يونجاليق
- Village
- Location within Iran
- Coordinates: 38°03′58″N 44°42′26″E
- Country: Iran
- Province: West Azerbaijan
- County: Salmas
- Bakhsh: Kuhsar
- Rural District: Chahriq

Population (2006)
  - Total: 101
- Time zone: UTC+3:30 (IRST)
  - Summer (DST): UTC+4:30 (IRDT)

Yunjaliq (Persian: يونجاليق, also Romanized as Yūnjālīq; also known as Yūnjeh Laq and Yūnjehlīq) is a village in Chahriq Rural District, Kuhsar District, Salmas County, West Azerbaijan Province, Iran. At the 2006 census, its population was 101, in 21 families.
