= Goleh Dam =

Goleh Dam گله دام
- Village
- Location within Iran
- Coordinates: 38°14′24″N 44°37′38″E
- Country: Iran
- Province: West Azerbaijan
- County: Salmas
- Bakhsh: Kuhsar
- Rural District: Shenetal

Population (2006)
  - Total: 181
- Time zone: UTC+3:30 (IRST)
  - Summer (DST): UTC+4:30 (IRDT)

Goleh Dam (Persian: گله دام, also Romanized as Goleh Dām; also known as Gol Ādam) is a village in Shenetal Rural District, Kuhsar District, Salmas County, West Azerbaijan Province, Iran. At the 2006 census, its population was 181, in 35 families.
