= Zarrin Darreh =

Zarrin Darreh زرين دره
- Village
- Location within Iran
- Coordinates: 38°09′42″N 44°38′01″E
- Country: Iran
- Province: West Azerbaijan
- County: Salmas
- Bakhsh: Kuhsar
- Rural District: Chahriq

Population (2006)
  - Total: 37
- Time zone: UTC+3:30 (IRST)
  - Summer (DST): UTC+4:30 (IRDT)

Zarrin Darreh (Persian: زرين دره, also Romanized as Zarrīn Darreh) is a village in Chahriq Rural District, Kuhsar District, Salmas County, West Azerbaijan Province, Iran. According to the 2006 census, its population was 37, residing in 8 families.
