= Karikan =

Karikan كريكان
- Village
- Location within Iran
- Coordinates: 37°57′48″N 44°17′23″E
- Country: Iran
- Province: West Azerbaijan
- County: Salmas
- Bakhsh: Kuhsar
- Rural District: Shepiran

Population (2006)
  - Total: 782
- Time zone: UTC+3:30 (IRST)
  - Summer (DST): UTC+4:30 (IRDT)

Karikan (Persian: كريكان, also Romanized as Karīkān; also known as Garīkān) is a village in Shepiran Rural District, Kuhsar District, Salmas County, West Azerbaijan Province, Iran. At the 2006 census, its population was 782, in 128 families.
