= Mateh Kharpeh =

Mateh Kharpeh ماته خرپه
- Village
- Location within Iran
- Coordinates: 38°07′25″N 44°33′30″E
- Country: Iran
- Province: West Azerbaijan
- County: Salmas
- Bakhsh: Kuhsar
- Rural District: Chahriq

Population (2006)
  - Total: 299
- Time zone: UTC+3:30 (IRST)
  - Summer (DST): UTC+4:30 (IRDT)

Mateh Kharpeh (Persian: ماته خرپه, also Romanized as Māteh Kharpeh; also known as Māteh Kharbeh) is a village in Chahriq Rural District, Kuhsar District, Salmas County, West Azerbaijan Province, Iran. At the 2006 census, its population was 299, in 54 families.
