= Tamrabad =

Tamrabad تمراباد
- Village
- Location within Iran
- Coordinates: 37°59′29″N 44°36′37″E
- Country: Iran
- Province: West Azerbaijan
- County: Salmas
- Bakhsh: Kuhsar
- Rural District: Chahriq

Population (2006)
  - Total: 113
- Time zone: UTC+3:30 (IRST)
  - Summer (DST): UTC+4:30 (IRDT)

Tamrabad (Persian: تمراباد, also Romanized as Tamrābād) is a village in Chahriq Rural District, Kuhsar District, Salmas County, West Azerbaijan Province, Iran. At the 2006 census, its population was 113, in 25 families.
