= Agh Barzeh =

Agh Barzeh اغ برزه
- Village
- Location within Iran
- Coordinates: 38°12′04″N 44°28′14″E
- Country: Iran
- Province: West Azerbaijan
- County: Salmas
- Bakhsh: Kuhsar
- Rural District: Shenetal

Population (2006)
  - Total: 509
- Time zone: UTC+3:30 (IRST)
  - Summer (DST): UTC+4:30 (IRDT)

Agh Barzeh (Persian: اغ برزه, also Romanized as Āgh Barzeh; and Āghbarzeh) is a village in Shenetal Rural District, Kuhsar District, Salmas County, West Azerbaijan Province, Iran. According to the 2006 census, its population was 509, residing in 92 families.
