= Pirmand =

Pirmand پيرمند
- Village
- Location within Iran
- Coordinates: 38°05′07″N 44°24′47″E
- Country: Iran
- Province: West Azerbaijan
- County: Salmas
- Bakhsh: Kuhsar
- Rural District: Shenetal

Population (2006)
  - Total: 134
- Time zone: UTC+3:30 (IRST)
  - Summer (DST): UTC+4:30 (IRDT)

Pirmand (Persian: پيرمند, also Romanized as Pīrmand) is a village in Shenetal Rural District, Kuhsar District, Salmas County, West Azerbaijan Province, Iran. At the 2006 census, its population was 134, in 26 families.
