= Ajvaj =

Village in West Azerbaijan province, Iran

Ajvaj Persian: اجواج
- Village
- Location within Iran
- Coordinates: 38°05′23″N 44°40′46″E
- Country: Iran
- Province: West Azerbaijan
- County: Salmas
- District: Kuhsar
- Rural District: Chahriq

Population (2016)
  - Total: 474
- Time zone: UTC+3:30 (IRST)

Ajvaj (Persian: اجواج) (Note: Also romanized as Ājvāj; in Armenian: Աջվաջ) is a village in Chahriq Rural District of Kuhsar District in Salmas County, West Azerbaijan province, Iran.

== Demographics ==
=== Population ===
At the time of the 2006 National Census, the village's population was 411 in 82 households. The following census in 2011 counted 445 people in 90 households. The 2016 census measured the population of the village as 474 people in 114 households.
