= Hasbasheh =

Village in West Azerbaijan province, Iran

Hasbasheh Persian: حسبشه
- Village
- Location within Iran
- Coordinates: 38°05′13″N 44°33′26″E
- Country: Iran
- Province: West Azerbaijan
- County: Salmas
- District: Kuhsar
- Rural District: Chahriq

Population (2016)
  - Total: 354
- Time zone: UTC+3:30 (IRST)

Hasbasheh (Persian: حسبشه) is a village in Chahriq Rural District of Kuhsar District in Salmas County, West Azerbaijan province, Iran.

== Demographics ==
=== Population ===
At the time of the 2006 National Census, the village's population was 343 in 60 households. The following census in 2011 counted 285 people in 55 households. The 2016 census measured the population of the village as 354 people in 80 households.
