= Sufiabad =

Sufiabad (Persian: صوفي آباد or صوفي اباد) may refer to:

- Sufiabad, Razavi Khorasan
- Sufiabad, Semnan
- Sufiabad, West Azerbaijan
- Sufiabad, Salmas, West Azerbaijan Province
