= Dustan =

Village in West Azerbaijan province, Iran

Dustan Persian: دوستان
- Village
- Location within Iran
- Coordinates: 37°56′09″N 44°26′06″E
- Country: Iran
- Province: West Azerbaijan
- County: Salmas
- District: Kuhsar
- Rural District: Shepiran

Population (2016)
  - Total: 486
- Time zone: UTC+3:30 (IRST)

Dustan (Persian: دوستان) (Note: Also romanized as Dūstān; also known as Dostan, also romanized as Dostān) is a village in Shepiran Rural District of Kuhsar District in Salmas County, West Azerbaijan province, Iran.

== Demographics ==
=== Population ===
At the time of the 2006 National Census, the village's population was 609 in 109 households. The following census in 2011 counted 632 people in 120 households. The 2016 census measured the population of the village as 486 people in 105 households.
