= Kalik, West Azerbaijan =

Village in West Azerbaijan province, Iran

Kalik Persian: كاليك
- Village
- Location within Iran
- Coordinates: 38°00′29″N 44°20′32″E
- Country: Iran
- Province: West Azerbaijan
- County: Salmas
- District: Kuhsar
- Rural District: Shepiran

Population (2016)
  - Total: 324
- Time zone: UTC+3:30 (IRST)

Kalik (Persian: كاليك) (Note: Also romanized as Kālīk) is a village in Shepiran Rural District of Kuhsar District in Salmas County, West Azerbaijan province, Iran.

== Demographics ==
=== Population ===
At the time of the 2006 National Census, the village's population was 330 in 53 households. The following census in 2011 counted 390 people in 75 households. The 2016 census measured the population of the village as 324 people in 68 households.
