= Qezel Kand, Iran =

Village in West Azerbaijan province, Iran

Qezel Kand Persian: قزل كند
- Village
- Location within Iran
- Coordinates: 38°13′43″N 44°27′55″E
- Country: Iran
- Province: West Azerbaijan
- County: Salmas
- District: Kuhsar
- Rural District: Shenatal

Population (2016)
  - Total: 573
- Time zone: UTC+3:30 (IRST)

Qezel Kand (Persian: قزل كند) (Note: Also known as Ghezel Kand) is a village in Shenatal Rural District of Kuhsar District in Salmas County, West Azerbaijan province, Iran.

== Demographics ==
=== Population ===
At the time of the 2006 National Census, the village's population was 489 in 93 households. The following census in 2011 counted 478 people in 102 households. The 2016 census measured the population of the village as 573 people in 136 households.
