= Shenetal =

Shenetal or Shenatal (Persian: شناتال) may refer to:

- Shenatal-e Olya
- Mazraeh-ye Shenatal-e Sofla
- Shenetal Rural District
