= Khurkhura =

Village in West Azerbaijan province, Iran

Khurkhura Persian: خورخورا
- Village
- Location within Iran
- Coordinates: 38°11′03″N 44°29′01″E
- Country: Iran
- Province: West Azerbaijan
- County: Salmas
- District: Kuhsar
- Rural District: Shenatal

Population (2016)
  - Total: 454
- Time zone: UTC+3:30 (IRST)

Khurkhura (Persian: خورخورا) (Note: Also romanized as Khowr Khowrā and Khūrkhūrā; formerly known as Khvor Khvoreh (خورخوره)) is a village in Shenatal Rural District of Kuhsar District in Salmas County, West Azerbaijan province, Iran.

== Demographics ==
=== Population ===
At the time of the 2006 National Census, the village's population, as Khvor Khvoreh, was 468 in 82 households. The following census in 2011 counted 452 people in 84 households, by which time the village was listed as Khurkhura. The 2016 census measured the population of the village as 454 people in 95 households.
