= Nazarabad, West Azerbaijan =

Village in West Azerbaijan province, Iran

Nazarabad Persian: نظراباد
- Village
- Location within Iran
- Coordinates: 38°11′46″N 44°36′10″E
- Country: Iran
- Province: West Azerbaijan
- County: Salmas
- District: Kuhsar
- Rural District: Shenatal

Population (2016)
  - Total: 591
- Time zone: UTC+3:30 (IRST)

Nazarabad (Persian: نظراباد) (Note: Also romanized as Naz̧arābād) is a village in Shenatal Rural District of Kuhsar District in Salmas County, West Azerbaijan province, Iran.

== Demographics ==
=== Population ===
At the time of the 2006 National Census, the village's population was 619 in 107 households. The following census in 2011 counted 639 people in 138 households. The 2016 census measured the population of the village as 591 people in 126 households.
