= Qasrik-e Sofla =

Qasrik-e Sofla قصريك سفلي
- Village
- Location within Iran
- Coordinates: 38°04′08″N 44°37′56″E
- Country: Iran
- Province: West Azerbaijan
- County: Salmas
- Bakhsh: Kuhsar
- Rural District: Shenetal

Population (2006)
  - Total: 228
- Time zone: UTC+3:30 (IRST)
  - Summer (DST): UTC+4:30 (IRDT)

Qasrik-e Sofla (Persian: قصريك سفلي, also Romanized as Qaşrīk-e Soflá; also known as Qaşrīk) is a village in Shenetal Rural District, Kuhsar District, Salmas County, West Azerbaijan Province, Iran. At the 2006 census, its population was 228, in 54 families.
