= Lulakabad-e Sofla =

Lulakabad-e Sofla لولك ابادسفلي
- Village
- Location within Iran
- Coordinates: 37°59′32″N 44°33′53″E
- Country: Iran
- Province: West Azerbaijan
- County: Salmas
- Bakhsh: Kuhsar
- Rural District: Chahriq

Population (2006)
  - Total: 143
- Time zone: UTC+3:30 (IRST)
  - Summer (DST): UTC+4:30 (IRDT)

Lulakabad-e Sofla (Persian: لولك ابادسفلي, also Romanized as Lūlakābād-e Soflá; also known as Lūlīkābād-e Pā'īn, Lūlīkābād-e Şūfīās, and Lūlīk-e Soflá) is a village in Chahriq Rural District, Kuhsar District, Salmas County, West Azerbaijan Province, Iran. At the 2006 census, its population was 143, in 23 families.
