= Bardehsur =

Bardehsur (Persian: برده سور) may refer to:

- Bardehsur, Sardasht
- Bardehsur, Urmia
