= Nushan =

Nushan (Persian: نوشان) may refer to:

- Nushan-e Olya
- Nushan-e Sofla
