= Qasrik-e Olya =

Qasrik-e Olya قصريك عليا
- Village
- Location within Iran
- Coordinates: 38°04′51″N 44°23′00″E
- Country: Iran
- Province: West Azerbaijan
- County: Salmas
- Bakhsh: Kuhsar
- Rural District: Shepiran

Population (2006)
  - Total: 231
- Time zone: UTC+3:30 (IRST)
  - Summer (DST): UTC+4:30 (IRDT)

Qasrik-e Olya (Persian: قصريك عليا, also Romanized as Qaşrīk-e ‘Olyā; also known as Qasrīk and Qaşrīk) is a village in Shepiran Rural District, Kuhsar District, Salmas County, West Azerbaijan Province, Iran. At the 2006 census, its population was 231, in 35 families.
