= Sudinabad =

Village in West Azerbaijan, Iran

Sudinabad سودين اباد
- Village
- Location within Iran
- Coordinates: 37°17′41″N 44°52′36″E
- Country: Iran
- Province: West Azerbaijan
- County: Urmia
- Bakhsh: Silvaneh
- Rural District: Margavar

Population (2006)
  - Total: 42
- Time zone: UTC+3:30 (IRST)
  - Summer (DST): UTC+4:30 (IRDT)

Sudinabad (Persian: سودين اباد, also Romanized as Sūdīnābād; also known as Sebdīnābād) is a village in Margavar Rural District, Silvaneh District, Urmia County, West Azerbaijan Province, Iran. At the 2006 census, its population was 42, in 10 families.
