= Qasrik, Salmas =

Qasrik قصريك
- Village
- Location within Iran
- Coordinates: 37°53′04″N 44°41′43″E
- Country: Iran
- Province: West Azerbaijan
- County: Salmas
- Bakhsh: Kuhsar
- Rural District: Chahriq

Population (2006)
  - Total: 199
- Time zone: UTC+3:30 (IRST)
  - Summer (DST): UTC+4:30 (IRDT)

Qasrik (Persian: قصريك, also Romanized as Qaşrīk; in Armenian: Գազրիկ) is a village in Chahriq Rural District, Kuhsar District, Salmas County, West Azerbaijan Province, Iran. In the 2006 census, its population was measured at 199 people within 37 families.
