= Delazi =

Village in West Azerbaijan province, Iran

Delazi Persian: دلزي
- Village
- Location within Iran
- Coordinates: 37°59′09″N 44°27′10″E
- Country: Iran
- Province: West Azerbaijan
- County: Salmas
- District: Kuhsar
- Rural District: Shepiran

Population (2016)
  - Total: 2,039
- Time zone: UTC+3:30 (IRST)

Delazi (Persian: دلزي) (Note: Also known as Defazi and Dīlazī) is a village in, and the capital of, Shepiran Rural District in Kuhsar District of Salmas County, West Azerbaijan province, Iran. The previous capital of the rural district was the village of Shirvani.

== Demographics ==
=== Population ===
At the time of the 2006 National Census, the village's population was 2,020 in 310 households. The following census in 2011 counted 2,230 people in 412 households. The 2016 census measured the population of the village as 2,039 people in 412 households. It was the most populous village in its rural district.
