= Ashnak, Iran =

Village in West Azerbaijan province, Iran

Ashnak Persian: اشنك
- Village
- Location within Iran
- Coordinates: 38°13′52″N 44°31′22″E
- Country: Iran
- Province: West Azerbaijan
- County: Salmas
- District: Kuhsar
- Rural District: Shenatal

Population (2016)
  - Total: 482
- Time zone: UTC+3:30 (IRST)

Ashnak (Persian: اشنك) (Note: Also romanized as Āshnāk) is a village in Shenatal Rural District of Kuhsar District in Salmas County, West Azerbaijan province, Iran.

== Demographics ==
=== Population ===
At the time of the 2006 National Census, the village's population was 745 in 135 households. The following census in 2011 counted 619 people in 132 households. The 2016 census measured the population of the village as 482 people in 117 households.
