= Lilus =

Village in West Azerbaijan province, Iran

Lilus Persian: ليلوس
- Village
- Location within Iran
- Coordinates: 38°09′37″N 44°33′35″E
- Country: Iran
- Province: West Azerbaijan
- County: Salmas
- District: Kuhsar
- Rural District: Chahriq

Population (2016)
  - Total: 421
- Time zone: UTC+3:30 (IRST)

Lilus (Persian: ليلوس) (Note: Also romanized as Līlūs) is a village in Chahriq Rural District of Kuhsar District in Salmas County, West Azerbaijan province, Iran.

== Demographics ==
=== Population ===
At the time of the 2006 National Census, the village's population was 335 in 64 households. The following census in 2011 counted 329 people in 65 households. The 2016 census measured the population of the village as 421 people in 101 households.
