= Kelah Rash =

Kelah Rash or Kelahrash (Persian: كله رش), also known as Kalderesh, may refer to:

- Kelah Rash-e Bala
- Kelah Rash-e Pain
