= Ostunrash =

Village in West Azerbaijan province, Iran

Ostunrash Persian: استون رش
- Village
- Location within Iran
- Coordinates: 38°00′36″N 44°24′50″E
- Country: Iran
- Province: West Azerbaijan
- County: Salmas
- District: Kuhsar
- Rural District: Shepiran

Population (2016)
  - Total: 1,045
- Time zone: UTC+3:30 (IRST)

Ostunrash (Persian: استون رش) (Note: Also romanized as Ostūnrash; also known as Sotūnrash) is a village in Shepiran Rural District of Kuhsar District in Salmas County, West Azerbaijan province, Iran.

== Demographics ==
=== Population ===
At the time of the 2006 National Census, the village's population was 758 in 104 households. The following census in 2011 counted 891 people in 156 households. The 2016 census measured the population of the village as 1,045 people in 215 households.
