= Aslanik =

Village in West Azerbaijan province, Iran

Aslanik Persian: اصلانيك
- Village
- Location within Iran
- Coordinates: 38°07′25″N 44°34′59″E
- Country: Iran
- Province: West Azerbaijan
- County: Salmas
- District: Kuhsar
- Rural District: Chahriq

Population (2016)
  - Total: 620
- Time zone: UTC+3:30 (IRST)

Aslanik (Persian: اصلانيك) (Note: Also romanized as Aşlānīk; in Armenian: Ասլանիկ) is a village in Chahriq Rural District of Kuhsar District in Salmas County, West Azerbaijan province, Iran.

== Demographics ==
=== Population ===
At the time of the 2006 National Census, the village's population was 527 in 92 households. The following census in 2011 counted 586 people in 118 households. The 2016 census measured the population of the village as 620 people in 152 households.
