= Haqvaran =

Village in West Azerbaijan province, Iran

Haqvaran Persian: حق وران
- Village
- Location within Iran
- Coordinates: 38°09′N 44°36′E
- Country: Iran
- Province: West Azerbaijan
- County: Salmas
- District: Kuhsar
- Rural District: Chahriq

Population (2016)
  - Total: 553
- Time zone: UTC+3:30 (IRST)

Haqvaran (Persian: حق وران) (Note: Also romanized as Ḩaqvarān; also known as Ḩaq Vīrān; in Armenian: Հախվերան) is a village in Chahriq Rural District of Kuhsar District in Salmas County, West Azerbaijan province, Iran.

== Demographics ==
=== Population ===
At the time of the 2006 National Census, the village's population was 504 in 100 households. The following census in 2011 counted 552 people in 120 households. The 2016 census measured the population of the village as 553 people in 142 households.
