= Derik, West Azerbaijan =

Derik دريك
- Village
- Location within Iran
- Coordinates: 38°14′04″N 44°37′53″E
- Country: Iran
- Province: West Azerbaijan
- County: Salmas
- Bakhsh: Kuhsar
- Rural District: Shenetal

Population (2006)
  - Total: 194
- Time zone: UTC+3:30 (IRST)
  - Summer (DST): UTC+4:30 (IRDT)

Derik (Persian: دريك, also Romanized as Derīk; also known as Dīrīk and Dirik Qal‘eh; in Armenian: Դերիկ or Առնա) is a village in Shenetal Rural District, Kuhsar District, Salmas County, West Azerbaijan Province, Iran. At the 2006 census, its population was 194, in 38 families.

== See also ==
- Monastery of Holy Mother of God (Arnavank) (hy)
