= Kelah Rash-e Pain =

Kelah Rash-e Pain كله رش پايين
- Village
- Location within Iran
- Coordinates: 37°55′00″N 44°17′00″E
- Country: Iran
- Province: West Azerbaijan
- County: Salmas
- Bakhsh: Kuhsar
- Rural District: Shepiran

Population (2006)
  - Total: 313
- Time zone: UTC+3:30 (IRST)
  - Summer (DST): UTC+4:30 (IRDT)

Kelah Rash-e Pain (Persian: كله رش پايين, also Romanized as Kelah Rash-e Pā’īn; also known as Kalderesh-e Soflá and Kelah Rash-e Soflá) is a village in Shepiran Rural District, Kuhsar District, Salmas County, West Azerbaijan Province, Iran. At the 2006 census, its population was 313, in 53 families.
