= Ali Bolaghi-ye Olya =

Village in West Azerbaijan province, Iran

Ali Bolaghi-ye Olya Persian: علي بلاغي عليا
- Village
- Location within Iran
- Coordinates: 38°11′21″N 44°31′19″E
- Country: Iran
- Province: West Azerbaijan
- County: Salmas
- District: Kuhsar
- Rural District: Shenatal

Population (2016)
  - Total: 450
- Time zone: UTC+3:30 (IRST)

Ali Bolaghi-ye Olya (Persian: علي بلاغي عليا) (Note: Also romanized as ‘Alī Bolāghī-ye ‘Olyā; formerly known as Ali Bolaghi (علي بلاغي), also romanized as ‘Alī Bolāghī) is a village in Shenatal Rural District of Kuhsar District in Salmas County, West Azerbaijan province, Iran.

== Demographics ==
=== Population ===
At the time of the 2006 National Census, the village's population, as Ali Bolaghi, was 438 in 71 households. The following census in 2011 counted 434 people in 82 households, by which time the village was listed as Ali Bolaghi-ye Olya. The 2016 census measured the population of the village as 450 people in 103 households.
