= Sufiabad-e Sofla =

Sufiabad-e Sofla صوفي ابادسفلي
- Village
- Location within Iran
- Coordinates: 38°12′39″N 44°33′51″E
- Country: Iran
- Province: West Azerbaijan
- County: Salmas
- Bakhsh: Kuhsar
- Rural District: Shenetal

Population (2006)
  - Total: 148
- Time zone: UTC+3:30 (IRST)
  - Summer (DST): UTC+4:30 (IRDT)

Sufiabad-e Sofla (Persian: صوفي ابادسفلي, also Romanized as Şūfīābād-e Soflá; also known as Şūfīābād) is a village in Shenetal Rural District, Kuhsar District, Salmas County, West Azerbaijan Province, Iran. According to the 2006 census, its population was 148, in 26 families.
