= Shiveh Dar =

Village in West Azerbaijan province, Iran

Shiveh Dar Persian: شيوادر
- Village
- Location within Iran
- Coordinates: 38°01′35″N 44°29′23″E
- Country: Iran
- Province: West Azerbaijan
- County: Salmas
- District: Kuhsar
- Rural District: Shepiran

Population (2016)
  - Total: 376
- Time zone: UTC+3:30 (IRST)

Shiveh Dar (Persian: شيوادر) (Note: Also romanized as Shīveh Dar; formerly known as Siveh Dar (سيوه در), also romanized as Sīveh Dar; also known as Shīveh Darreh and Sīveh Darreh) is a village in Shepiran Rural District of Kuhsar District in Salmas County, West Azerbaijan province, Iran.

== Demographics ==
=== Population ===
At the time of the 2006 National Census, the village's population, as Siveh Dar, was 343 in 55 households. The following census in 2011 counted 255 people in 54 households, by which time the village was listed as Shiveh Dar. The 2016 census measured the population of the village as 376 people in 78 households.
