= Gabrabad =

Village in West Azerbaijan province, Iran

Gabrabad Persian: گبراباد
- Village
- Location within Iran
- Coordinates: 38°13′21″N 44°38′04″E
- Country: Iran
- Province: West Azerbaijan
- County: Salmas
- District: Kuhsar
- Rural District: Shenatal

Population (2016)
  - Total: 492
- Time zone: UTC+3:30 (IRST)

Gabrabad (Persian: گبراباد) (Note: Also romanized as Gabrābād) is a village in Shenatal Rural District of Kuhsar District in Salmas County, West Azerbaijan province, Iran.

== Demographics ==
=== Population ===
At the time of the 2006 National Census, the village's population was 400 in 75 households. The following census in 2011 counted 489 people in 110 households. The 2016 census measured the population of the village as 492 people in 102 households.
