= Kuzehrash =

Village in West Azerbaijan province, Iran

Kuzehrash Persian: كوزه رش
- Village
- Location within Iran
- Coordinates: 38°09′40″N 44°27′55″E
- Country: Iran
- Province: West Azerbaijan
- County: Salmas
- District: Kuhsar
- Rural District: Shenatal

Population (2016)
  - Total: 1,501
- Time zone: UTC+3:30 (IRST)

Kuzehrash (Persian: كوزه رش) (Note: Also romanized as Kūzeh Rash and Kūzehrash) is a village in, and the capital of, Shenatal Rural District in Kuhsar District of Salmas County, West Azerbaijan province, Iran.

== Demographics ==
=== Population ===
At the time of the 2006 National Census, the village's population was 1,458 in 222 households. The following census in 2011 counted 1,377 people in 288 households. The 2016 census measured the population of the village as 1,501 people in 334 households. It was the most populous village in its rural district.
