= Hajji Jafan =

Village in West Azerbaijan province, Iran

Hajji Jafan Persian: حاجي جفان
- Village
- Location within Iran
- Coordinates: 38°08′06″N 44°27′04″E
- Country: Iran
- Province: West Azerbaijan
- County: Salmas
- District: Kuhsar
- Rural District: Shenatal

Population (2016)
  - Total: 420
- Time zone: UTC+3:30 (IRST)

Hajji Jafan (Persian: حاجي جفان) (Note: Also romanized as Ḩājjī Jafān) is a village in Shenatal Rural District of Kuhsar District in Salmas County, West Azerbaijan province, Iran.

== Demographics ==
=== Population ===
At the time of the 2006 National Census, the village's population was 458 in 87 households. The following census in 2011 counted 330 people in 74 households. The 2016 census measured the population of the village as 420 people in 100 households.
