= Lulikabad =

Lulikabad (Persian: لوليك اباد), also known as Lulik, may refer to:

- Lulikabad-e Bala
- Lulikabad-e Pain
