= Kapik =

Village in West Azerbaijan province, Iran

Kapik Persian: كاپيك
- Village
- Location within Iran
- Coordinates: 38°10′45″N 44°33′26″E
- Country: Iran
- Province: West Azerbaijan
- County: Salmas
- District: Kuhsar
- Rural District: Shenatal

Population (2016)
  - Total: 475
- Time zone: UTC+3:30 (IRST)

Kapik (Persian: كاپيك) (Note: Also romanized as Kāpīk; in Armenian: Քապիկ) is a village in Shenatal Rural District of Kuhsar District in Salmas County, West Azerbaijan province, Iran.

== Demographics ==
=== Population ===
At the time of the 2006 National Census, the village's population was 592 in 110 households. The following census in 2011 counted 554 people in 108 households. The 2016 census measured the population of the village as 475 people in 126 households.
