= Berushkhvaran =

Village in West Azerbaijan province, Iran

Berushkhvaran Persian: بروشخواران
- Village
- Location within Iran
- Coordinates: 38°16′40″N 44°28′52″E
- Country: Iran
- Province: West Azerbaijan
- County: Salmas
- District: Kuhsar
- Rural District: Shenatal

Population (2016)
  - Total: 797
- Time zone: UTC+3:30 (IRST)

Berushkhvaran (Persian: بروشخواران) (Note: Also romanized as Berūshkhvārān; Kurdish: Broşxuran) is a village in Shenatal Rural District of Kuhsar District in Salmas County, West Azerbaijan province, Iran.

== Demographics ==
=== Population ===
At the time of the 2006 National Census, the village's population was 785 in 160 households. The following census in 2011 counted 754 people in 144 households. The 2016 census measured the population of the village as 797 people in 175 households.
