= Qabakh Tappeh =

Qabakh Tappeh قاباخ تپه
- Village
- Location within Iran
- Coordinates: 38°06′51″N 44°50′23″E
- Country: Iran
- Province: West Azerbaijan
- County: Salmas
- Bakhsh: Central
- Rural District: Kenarporuzh

Population (2006)
  - Total: 157
- Time zone: UTC+3:30 (IRST)
  - Summer (DST): UTC+4:30 (IRDT)

Qabakh Tappeh (Persian: قاباخ تپه, also Romanized as Qābākh Tappeh and Qabākh Tappeh) is a village in Kenarporuzh Rural District, in the Central District of Salmas County, West Azerbaijan Province, Iran. At the 2006 census, its population was 157, in 28 families.
