= Senji, Salmas =

Village in West Azerbaijan province, Iran

Senji Persian: سنجي
- Village
- Location within Iran
- Coordinates: 38°11′51″N 44°32′04″E
- Country: Iran
- Province: West Azerbaijan
- County: Salmas
- District: Kuhsar
- Rural District: Shenatal

Population (2016)
  - Total: 473
- Time zone: UTC+3:30 (IRST)

Senji (Persian: سنجي) (Note: Also romanized as Senjī) is a village in Shenatal Rural District of Kuhsar District in Salmas County, West Azerbaijan province, Iran.

== Demographics ==
=== Population ===
At the time of the 2006 National Census, the village's population was 521 in 99 households. The following census in 2011 counted 473 people in 99 households. The 2016 census measured the population of the village as 473 people in 117 households.
