= Heshterak =

Village in West Azerbaijan province, Iran

Heshterak Persian: هشتراك
- Village
- Location within Iran
- Coordinates: 37°59′45″N 44°19′13″E
- Country: Iran
- Province: West Azerbaijan
- County: Salmas
- District: Kuhsar
- Rural District: Shepiran

Population (2016)
  - Total: 488
- Time zone: UTC+3:30 (IRST)

Heshterak (Persian: هشتراك) (Note: Also romanized as Hashterāk and Heshtarāk) is a village in Shepiran Rural District of Kuhsar District in Salmas County, West Azerbaijan province, Iran.

== Demographics ==
=== Population ===
At the time of the 2006 National Census, the village's population was 579 in 115 households. The following census in 2011 counted 456 people in 97 households. The 2016 census measured the population of the village as 488 people in 103 households.
