= Halulan =

Halulan هالولان
- Village
- Location within Iran
- Coordinates: 37°32′52″N 44°45′05″E
- Country: Iran
- Province: West Azerbaijan
- County: Urmia
- Bakhsh: Silvaneh
- Rural District: Targavar

Population (2006)
  - Total: 181
- Time zone: UTC+3:30 (IRST)
  - Summer (DST): UTC+4:30 (IRDT)

Halulan (Persian: هالولان, also Romanized as Hālūlān; also known as Āshkī Hālūlān, Hārowlān, Hārūlān, and Hārūyān) is a village in Targavar Rural District, Silvaneh District, Urmia County, West Azerbaijan Province, Iran. At the 2006 census, its population was 181, in 35 families.

== Name ==
According to Vladimir Minorsky, the name Hārūlān is derived from the Mongol tribe called Arulan or Arulat.
