= Gerdian =

Gerdian, Gerdeyan or Gardian (Persian: گرديان) may refer to:

- Gerdian, Hamadan
- Gardian, West Azerbaijan
