= Garmavich =

Village in West Azerbaijan province, Iran

Garmavich Persian: گرماويچ
- Village
- Location within Iran
- Coordinates: 38°06′24″N 44°31′22″E
- Country: Iran
- Province: West Azerbaijan
- County: Salmas
- District: Kuhsar
- Rural District: Chahriq

Population (2016)
  - Total: 390
- Time zone: UTC+3:30 (IRST)

Garmavich (Persian: گرماويچ) (Note: Also romanized as Garmāvīch) is a village in Chahriq Rural District of Kuhsar District in Salmas County, West Azerbaijan province, Iran.

== Demographics ==
=== Population ===
At the time of the 2006 National Census, the village's population was 372 in 72 households. The following census in 2011 counted 326 people in 65 households. The 2016 census measured the population of the village as 390 people in 78 households.
