= Shirvani, West Azerbaijan =

Village in West Azerbaijan province, Iran

Shirvani Persian: شيرواني
- Village
- Location within Iran
- Coordinates: 37°57′12″N 44°24′18″E
- Country: Iran
- Province: West Azerbaijan
- County: Salmas
- District: Kuhsar
- Rural District: Shepiran

Population (2016)
  - Total: 1,024
- Time zone: UTC+3:30 (IRST)

Shirvani (Persian: شيرواني) (Note: Also romanized as Shīrvānī) is a village in, and the former capital of, Shepiran Rural District in Kuhsar District of Salmas County, West Azerbaijan province, Iran. The capital of the rural district has been transferred to the village of Delazi.

== Demographics ==
=== Population ===
At the time of the 2006 National Census, the village's population was 1,199 in 190 households. The following census in 2011 counted 1,173 people in 220 households. The 2016 census measured the population of the village as 1,024 people in 212 households.
