= Katban =

Village in West Azerbaijan province, Iran

Katban Persian: كتبان
- Village
- Location within Iran
- Coordinates: 38°06′16″N 44°35′24″E
- Country: Iran
- Province: West Azerbaijan
- County: Salmas
- District: Kuhsar
- Rural District: Chahriq

Population (2016)
  - Total: 300
- Time zone: UTC+3:30 (IRST)

Katban (Persian: كتبان (Note: Also romanized as Katbān; also known as Kordovān) is a village in Chahriq Rural District of Kuhsar District in Salmas County, West Azerbaijan province, Iran, serving as capital of the district.

== Demographics ==
=== Population ===
At the time of the 2006 National Census, the village's population was 232 in 41 households. The following census in 2011 counted 258 people in 55 households. The 2016 census measured the population of the village as 300 people in 82 households.
