= Shiveh, Iran =

Shiveh or Shivah (Persian: شيوه) in Iran may refer to:

- Shiveh, South Khorasan
- Shiveh, West Azerbaijan
- Shivah, Zanjan
