= Lulakabad-e Olya =

Lulakabad-e Olya لولك ابادعليا
- Village
- Location within Iran
- Coordinates: 37°58′50″N 44°35′17″E
- Country: Iran
- Province: West Azerbaijan
- County: Salmas
- Bakhsh: Kuhsar
- Rural District: Chahriq

Population (2006)
  - Total: 82
- Time zone: UTC+3:30 (IRST)
  - Summer (DST): UTC+4:30 (IRDT)

Lulakabad-e Olya (Persian: لولك ابادعليا, also Romanized as Lūlakābād-e ‘Olyā; also known as Lūlīkābād-e Bālā, Lūlīkābād-e ‘Olyā, and Lūlīk-e ‘Olyā) is a village in Chahriq Rural District, Kuhsar District, Salmas County, West Azerbaijan Province, Iran. At the 2006 census, its population was 82, in 15 families.
