= Gardian, West Azerbaijan =

Gordian گرديان
- village
- Location within Iran
- Coordinates: 38°00′22″N 44°35′29″E
- Country: Iran
- Province: West Azerbaijan
- County: Salmas
- Bakhsh: Kuhsar
- Rural District: Chahriq

Population (2006)
  - Total: 158
- Time zone: UTC+3:30 (IRST)
  - Summer (DST): UTC+4:30 (IRDT)

Gordian (Persian: گرديان, also Romanized as Gordīān) is a village in Chahriq Rural District, Kuhsar District, Salmas County, West Azerbaijan Province, Iran. At the 2006 census, its population was 158, in 26 families.
