= Khaneqah, Urmia =

Village in West Azerbaijan province, Iran

Khaneqah Persian: خانقاه
- Village
- Location within Iran
- Coordinates: 37°32′57″N 44°43′53″E
- Country: Iran
- Province: West Azerbaijan
- County: Urmia
- District: Silvaneh
- Rural District: Targavar

Population (2016)
  - Total: 498
- Time zone: UTC+3:30 (IRST)

Khaneqah (Persian: خانقاه) (Note: Also romanized as Khāneqāh) is a village in Targavar Rural District of Silvaneh District in Urmia County, West Azerbaijan province, Iran.

== Demographics ==
=== Population ===
At the time of the 2006 National Census, the village's population was 470 in 78 households. The following census in 2011 counted 443 people in 93 households. The 2016 census measured the population of the village as 498 people in 111 households.
