= Berazan, West Azerbaijan =

Village in West Azerbaijan province, Iran

Berazan Persian: برازان
- Village
- Location within Iran
- Coordinates: 37°16′32″N 44°55′20″E
- Country: Iran
- Province: West Azerbaijan
- County: Urmia
- District: Silvaneh
- Rural District: Margavar

Population (2016)
  - Total: 1,554
- Time zone: UTC+3:30 (IRST)

Berazan (Persian: برازان) (Note: Also romanized as Bārāzān and Berāzān) is a village in Margavar Rural District of Silvaneh District in Urmia County, West Azerbaijan province, Iran.

== Demographics ==
=== Population ===
At the time of the 2006 National Census, the village's population was 1,298 in 212 households. The following census in 2011 counted 1,398 people in 340 households. The 2016 census measured the population of the village as 1,554 people in 396 households.
