= Bahik =

Neighborhood in West Azerbaijan province, Iran

Bahik Persian: بهيك
- Neighborhood
- Location within Iran
- Coordinates: 38°05′34″N 44°38′34″E
- Country: Iran
- Province: West Azerbaijan
- County: Salmas
- District: Kuhsar
- Rural District: Chahriq
- Village: Zula Bahik

Population (2006)
  - Total: 281
- Time zone: UTC+3:30 (IRST)

Bahik (Persian: بهيك) (Note: Also romanized as Bahīk) is a neighborhood in the village of Zula Bahik in Chahriq Rural District of Kuhsar District in Salmas County, West Azerbaijan province, Iran.

== History ==
The "Village of Bahik" is a protocol signed in Constantinople in 1913 which drew most of the modern Turkey-Iran border. The agreement which was signed in the presence of Iranian, Ottoman, Russian, and British delegates stipulated that the village of Bahik, in addition to a number of others, remain as a part of Persia, modern day Iran.

After the 2006 National Census, Bahik was merged with the village of Zula to form the new village of Zula Bahik.

== Demographics ==
=== Ethnicity ===
The village's inhabitants are mainly Kurds, particularly those of the Deri tribe who have lived here for more than five-centuries.

=== Population ===
At the time of the 2006 census, Bahik's population was 281 in 56 households, when it was a village in Chahriq Rural District.

== Location ==
The village is located on the outskirts of the Iran-Turkey border and has, for centuries, served as a passage between Iran and Turkey. The village is located approximately 50 km northwest of the provincial capital of Urmia.
