= Harakian, West Azerbaijan =

Village in West Azerbaijan province, Iran

Harakian Persian: هركيان
- Village
- Location within Iran
- Coordinates: 37°54′38″N 44°22′37″E
- Country: Iran
- Province: West Azerbaijan
- County: Salmas
- District: Kuhsar
- Rural District: Shepiran

Population (2016)
  - Total: 405
- Time zone: UTC+3:30 (IRST)

Harakian (Persian: هركيان) (Note: Also romanized as Harakīān) is a village in Shepiran Rural District of Kuhsar District in Salmas County, West Azerbaijan province, Iran.

== Demographics ==
=== Population ===
At the time of the 2006 National Census, the village's population was 518 in 96 households. The following census in 2011 counted 404 people in 76 households. The 2016 census measured the population of the village as 405 people in 181 households.
