= Sheyban, West Azerbaijan =

Village in West Azerbaijan province, Iran

Sheyban Persian: شيبان
- Village
- Location within Iran
- Coordinates: 37°32′25″N 44°48′30″E
- Country: Iran
- Province: West Azerbaijan
- County: Urmia
- District: Silvaneh
- Rural District: Targavar

Population (2016)
  - Total: 357
- Time zone: UTC+3:30 (IRST)

Sheyban (Persian: شيبان) (Note: Also romanized as Sheybān) is a village in Targavar Rural District of Silvaneh District in Urmia County, West Azerbaijan province, Iran.

== Demographics ==
=== Population ===
At the time of the 2006 National Census, the village's population was 364 in 50 households. The following census in 2011 counted 289 people in 57 households. The 2016 census measured the population of the village as 357 people in 73 households.
