= Akhyan =

Village in West Azerbaijan province, Iran

Akhyan Persian: اخيان
- Village
- Location within Iran
- Coordinates: 38°06′35″N 44°48′12″E
- Country: Iran
- Province: West Azerbaijan
- County: Salmas
- District: Central
- Rural District: Kenarporuzh

Population (2016)
  - Total: 406
- Time zone: UTC+3:30 (IRST)

Akhyan (Persian: اخيان) (Note: Also romanized as Akhyān) is a village in Kenarporuzh Rural District of the Central District in Salmas County, West Azerbaijan province, Iran.

== Demographics ==
=== Population ===
At the time of the 2006 National Census, the village's population was 365 in 65 households. The following census in 2011 counted 402 people in 89 households. The 2016 census showed the population as 406 people in 91 households.
