= Tibatan =

Village in West Azerbaijan province, Iran

Tibatan Persian: تي باتان
- Village
- Location within Iran
- Coordinates: 37°30′54″N 44°48′23″E
- Country: Iran
- Province: West Azerbaijan
- County: Urmia
- District: Silvaneh
- Rural District: Targavar

Population (2016)
  - Total: 396
- Time zone: UTC+3:30 (IRST)

Tibatan (Persian: تي باتان) (Note: Also romanized as Tībātān and Tībatān) is a village in Targavar Rural District of Silvaneh District in Urmia County, West Azerbaijan province, Iran.

== Demographics ==
=== Population ===
At the time of the 2006 National Census, the village's population was 341 in 61 households. The following census in 2011 counted 363 people in 73 households. The 2016 census measured the population of the village as 396 people in 88 households.
