= Kelah Rash-e Bala =

Village in West Azerbaijan province, Iran

Kelah Rash-e Bala Persian: كله رش بالا
- Village
- Location within Iran
- Coordinates: 37°54′03″N 44°16′55″E
- Country: Iran
- Province: West Azerbaijan
- County: Salmas
- District: Kuhsar
- Rural District: Shepiran

Population (2016)
  - Total: 748
- Time zone: UTC+3:30 (IRST)

Kelah Rash-e Bala (Persian: كله رش بالا) (Note: Also romanized as Kelah Rash-e Bālā; also known as Kalderesh-e ‘Olyā and Kelahrash-e ‘Olyā (كله رش عليا)) is a village in Shepiran Rural District of Kuhsar District in Salmas County, West Azerbaijan province, Iran.

== Demographics ==
=== Population ===
At the time of the 2006 National Census, the village's population was 757 in 129 households. The following census in 2011 counted 766 people in 145 households. The 2016 census measured the population of the village as 748 people in 153 households.
