= Khan Takhti =

Village in West Azerbaijan province, Iran

Khan Takhti Persian: خان تختي
- Village
- Location within Iran
- Coordinates: 38°08′22″N 44°55′49″E
- Country: Iran
- Province: West Azerbaijan
- County: Salmas
- District: Central
- Rural District: Kenarporuzh

Population (2016)
  - Total: 393
- Time zone: UTC+3:30 (IRST)

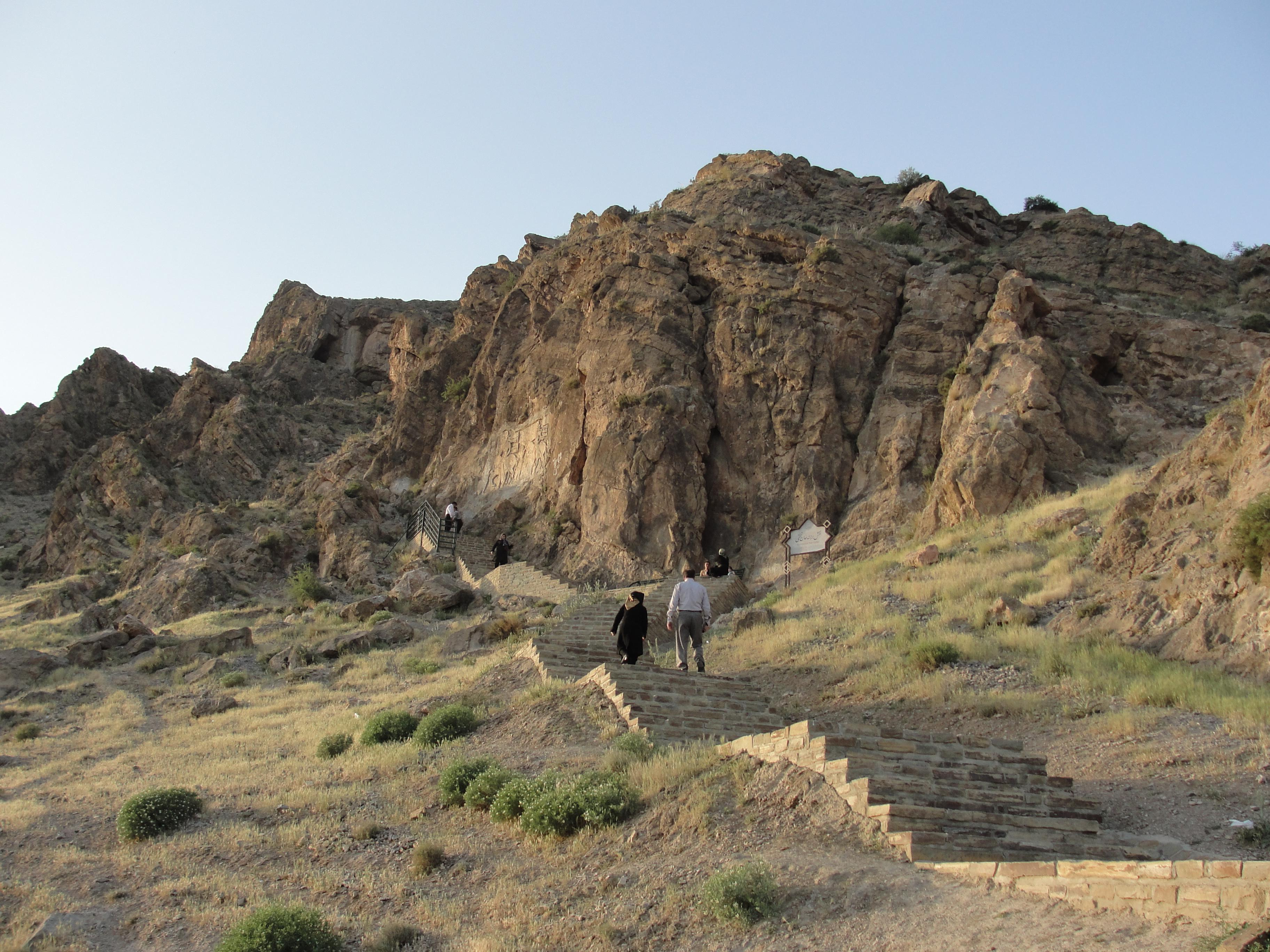
View of Khan Takhti rock relief from Salmas to Urmia road

Khan Takhti (Persian: خان تختي) (Note: Also romanized as Khān Takhtī and Khantakhty; also known as Khantakh; in Armenian: Խանթախտ) is a village in Kenarporuzh Rural District of the Central District in Salmas County, West Azerbaijan province, Iran.

== Population ==
At the time of the 2006 National Census, the village's population was 419 in 119 households. The following census in 2011 counted 422 people in 126 households. The 2016 census showed the population as 393 people in 120 households.
