= Moghul, Iran =

Village in West Azerbaijan province, Iran

Moghul Persian: مغول
- Village
- Location within Iran
- Coordinates: 38°05′30″N 44°55′10″E
- Country: Iran
- Province: West Azerbaijan
- County: Salmas
- District: Central
- Rural District: Kenarporuzh

Population (2016)
  - Total: 571
- Time zone: UTC+3:30 (IRST)

Moghul (Persian: مغول) (Note: Also romanized as Moghūl) is a village in Kenarporuzh Rural District of the Central District in Salmas County, West Azerbaijan province, Iran.

== Population ==
At the time of the 2006 National Census, the village's population was 622 in 119 households. The following census in 2011 counted 609 people in 152 households. The 2016 census showed the population as 571 people in 161 households.
