= Aq Ziarat =

Village in West Azerbaijan province, Iran

Aq Ziarat Persian: اق زيارت
- Village
- Location within Iran
- Coordinates: 38°08′10″N 44°58′09″E
- Country: Iran
- Province: West Azerbaijan
- County: Salmas
- District: Central
- Rural District: Kenarporuzh

Population (2016)
  - Total: 414
- Time zone: UTC+3:30 (IRST)

Aq Ziarat (Persian: اق زيارت) (Note: Also romanized as Āq Zīārat; also known as Āgh Zīārat (آغ زيارت) and Āghzīārat) is a village in Kenarporuzh Rural District of the Central District in Salmas County, West Azerbaijan province, Iran.

== Population ==
At the time of the 2006 National Census, the village's population was 534 in 115 households. The following census in 2011 counted 423 people in 105 households. The 2016 census showed the population as 414 people in 123 households.
