= Pesan =

Village in West Azerbaijan province, Iran

Pesan Persian: پسان
- Village
- Location within Iran
- Coordinates: 37°37′21″N 44°45′17″E
- Country: Iran
- Province: West Azerbaijan
- County: Urmia
- District: Silvaneh
- Rural District: Targavar

Population (2016)
  - Total: 354
- Time zone: UTC+3:30 (IRST)

Pesan (Persian: پسان) (Note: Also romanized as Pesān; also known as Yesān) is a village in Targavar Rural District of Silvaneh District in Urmia County, West Azerbaijan province, Iran.

== Demographics ==
=== Population ===
At the time of the 2006 National Census, the village's population was 402 in 76 households. The following census in 2011 counted 355 people in 79 households. The 2016 census measured the population of the village as 354 people in 79 households.
