= Balukan =

Balukan (Persian: بلوكان) may refer to:

- Balukan, Ardabil
- Balakan, Iran (disambiguation), two places
