= Shahrak-e Ziveh =

Village in West Azerbaijan province, Iran

Shahrak-e Ziveh Persian: شهرك زيوه
- Village
- Location within Iran
- Coordinates: 37°14′55″N 44°54′20″E
- Country: Iran
- Province: West Azerbaijan
- County: Urmia
- District: Silvaneh
- Rural District: Margavar

Population (2016)
  - Total: 1,110
- Time zone: UTC+3:30 (IRST)

Shahrak-e Ziveh (Persian: شهرك زيوه) (Note: Also romanized as Shahrak-e Zīveh; also known as Zīvah) is a village in Margavar Rural District of Silvaneh District in Urmia County, West Azerbaijan province, Iran.

== Demographics ==
=== Population ===
At the time of the 2006 National Census, the village's population was 1,787 in 325 households. The following census in 2011 counted 2,366 people in 530 households. The 2016 census measured the population of the village as 1,110 people in 289 households.
