= Kasian, Urmia =

Village in West Azerbaijan province, Iran

Kasian Persian: كسيان
- Village
- Location within Iran
- Coordinates: 37°11′56″N 44°54′54″E
- Country: Iran
- Province: West Azerbaijan
- County: Urmia
- District: Silvaneh
- Rural District: Margavar

Population (2016)
  - Total: 1,518
- Time zone: UTC+3:30 (IRST)

Kasian (Persian: كسيان) (Note: Also romanized as Kasīān and Kasyān; also known as Geseyān, Gīsīan, Kīsīan, and Kīsyān) is a village in Margavar Rural District of Silvaneh District in Urmia County, West Azerbaijan province, Iran.

== Demographics ==
=== Population ===
At the time of the 2006 National Census, the village's population was 1,314 in 236 households. The following census in 2011 counted 1,389 people in 306 households. The 2016 census measured the population of the village as 1,518 people in 375 households.
