= Dizaj, West Azerbaijan =

Village in West Azerbaijan province, Iran

Dizaj Persian: ديزج
- Village
- Location within Iran
- Coordinates: 37°12′43″N 44°55′39″E
- Country: Iran
- Province: West Azerbaijan
- County: Urmia
- District: Silvaneh
- Rural District: Margavar

Population (2016)
  - Total: 4,907
- Time zone: UTC+3:30 (IRST)

Dizaj (Persian: ديزج) (Note: Also romanized as Dīzaj; also known as Dizaj-e Margavar) is a village in Margavar Rural District of Silvaneh District in Urmia County, West Azerbaijan province, Iran.

== Demographics ==
=== Ethnicity ===
The village is populated by Kurds.

=== Population ===
At the time of the 2006 National Census, the village's population was 3,440 in 634 households. The following census in 2011 counted 3,952 people in 976 households. The 2016 census measured the population of the village as 4,907 people in 1,266 households. It was the most populous village in its rural district.
