= Nushan-e Sofla =

Nushan-e Sofla نوشان سفلي
- Village
- Location within Iran
- Coordinates: 37°27′49″N 44°56′05″E
- Country: Iran
- Province: West Azerbaijan
- County: Urmia
- Bakhsh: Silvaneh
- Rural District: Dasht

Population (2006)
  - Total: 180
- Time zone: UTC+3:30 (IRST)
  - Summer (DST): UTC+4:30 (IRDT)

Nushan-e Sofla (Persian: نوشان سفلي, also Romanized as Nūshān-e Soflá) is a village in Dasht Rural District, Silvaneh District, Urmia County, West Azerbaijan Province, Iran. At the 2006 census, its population was 180, in 30 families.
