= Zharabad, Silvaneh =

Village in West Azerbaijan province, Iran

Zharabad Persian: ژاراباد
- Village
- Location within Iran
- Coordinates: 37°13′32″N 44°57′53″E
- Country: Iran
- Province: West Azerbaijan
- County: Urmia
- District: Silvaneh
- Rural District: Margavar

Population (2016)
  - Total: 1,118
- Time zone: UTC+3:30 (IRST)

Zharabad (Persian: ژاراباد) (Note: Also romanized as Zhārābād) is a village in Margavar Rural District of Silvaneh District in Urmia County, West Azerbaijan province, Iran.

== Demographics ==
=== Population ===
At the time of the 2006 National Census, the village's population was 1,017 in 164 households. The following census in 2011 counted 1,094 people in 263 households. The 2016 census measured the population of the village as 1,118 people in 261 households.
