= Al-Barazi =

Al-Barazi (Arabic: البرازي) is a surname. It is a prominent family originally from Hama, Syria. Descendants are present in the US, France, Lebanon, Saudi Arabia, the United Kingdom, etc.

== List of people with the surname ==
- Husni al-Barazi (1895–1975), Former prime minister of Syria
- Muhsin al-Barazi (1904–1949), Syrian lawyer, academic and politician
- Azad Al-Barazi (born 1988), American-Syrian swimmer
- Talal Al-Barazi (born 1963), Syrian politician
- Arwa Damon (born 1977), American journalist

== See also ==
- Barazi
