= Bardehsur, Urmia =

Bardehsur برده سور
- Village
- Location within Iran
- Coordinates: 37°26′17″N 44°49′39″E
- Country: Iran
- Province: West Azerbaijan
- County: Urmia
- Bakhsh: Silvaneh
- Rural District: Dasht

Population (2006)
  - Total: 207
- Time zone: UTC+3:30 (IRST)
  - Summer (DST): UTC+4:30 (IRDT)

Bardehsur (Persian: برده سور, also Romanized as Bardehsūr) is a village in Dasht Rural District, Silvaneh District, Urmia County, West Azerbaijan Province, Iran. At the 2006 census, its population was 207, in 35 families.
