= Minas, Iran =

Village in West Azerbaijan province, Iran

Minas Persian: ميناس
- Village
- Location within Iran
- Coordinates: 38°09′33″N 44°54′15″E
- Country: Iran
- Province: West Azerbaijan
- County: Salmas
- District: Central
- Rural District: Kenarporuzh

Population (2016)
  - Total: 491
- Time zone: UTC+3:30 (IRST)

Minas (Persian: ميناس) (Note: Also romanized as Mīnās; in Armenian: Մինաս) is a village in Kenarporuzh Rural District of the Central District in Salmas County, West Azerbaijan province, Iran.

== Population ==
At the time of the 2006 National Census, the village's population was 565 in 137 households. The following census in 2011 counted 522 people in 156 households. The 2016 census showed the population as 491 people in 158 households.
