= Abgarm, Salmas =

Village in West Azerbaijan province, Iran

Abgarm Persian: ابگرم
- Village
- Location within Iran
- Coordinates: 38°02′43″N 44°56′41″E
- Country: Iran
- Province: West Azerbaijan
- County: Salmas
- District: Central
- Rural District: Kenarporuzh

Population (2016)
  - Total: 469
- Time zone: UTC+3:30 (IRST)

Abgarm (Persian: آب‌گرم) (Note: Also romanized as Āb Garm, Āb-e Garm, and Ābgarm; also known as Darmānābād, Īstī Sū and Azerbaijani: İstisu) is a village in Kenarporuzh Rural District of the Central District in Salmas County, West Azerbaijan province, Iran.

== Demographics ==
=== Language ===
The village's people speak Azeri.

=== Population ===
At the time of the 2006 National Census, the village's population was 598 in 113 households. The following census in 2011 counted 534 people in 123 households. The 2016 census showed the population as 469 people in 139 households.
