= Shurgol, West Azerbaijan =

Village in West Azerbaijan province, Iran

Shurgol Persian: شورگل
- Village
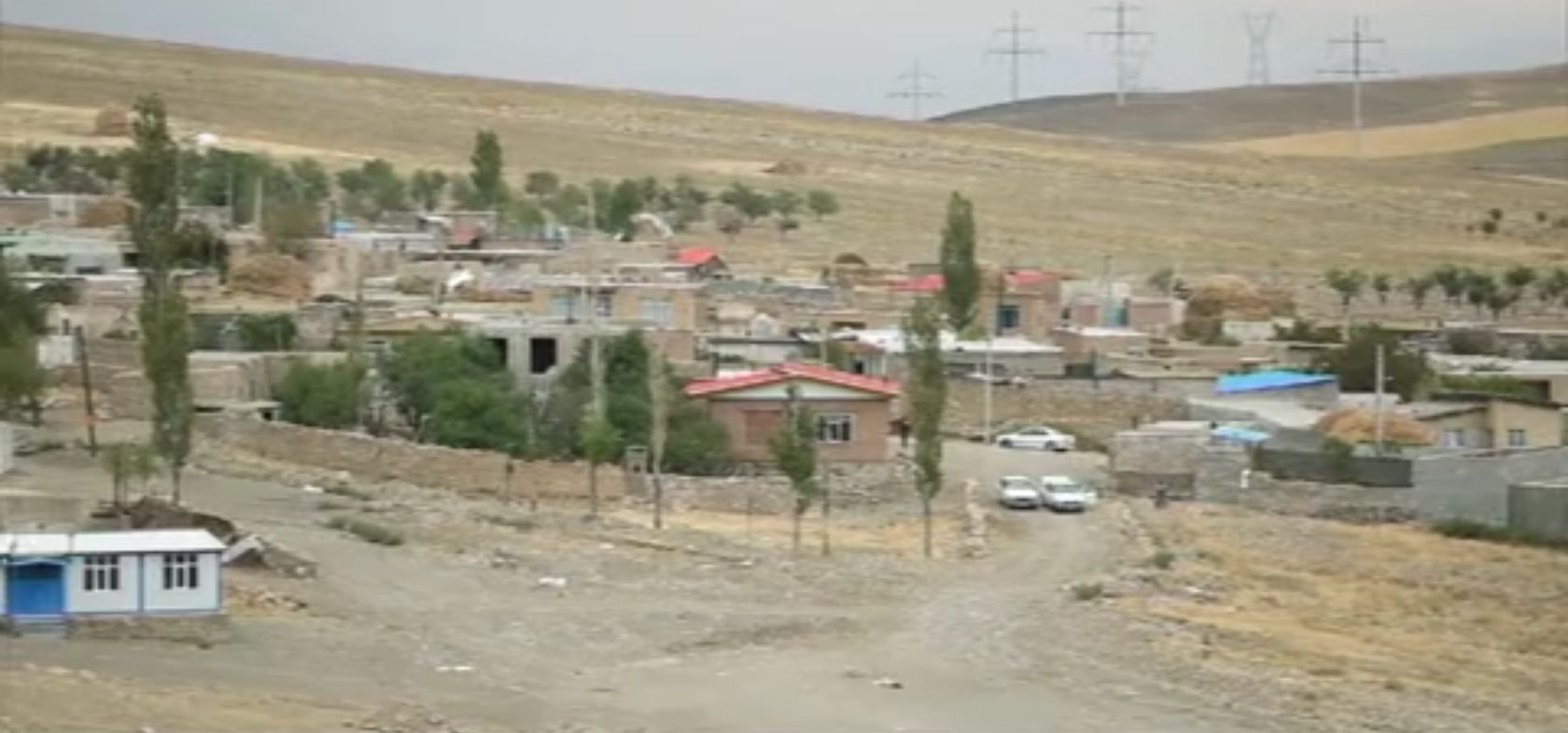
- The village of Shurgol

- Location within Iran
- Coordinates: 38°05′04″N 44°50′28″E
- Country: Iran
- Province: West Azerbaijan
- County: Salmas
- District: Central
- Rural District: Kenarporuzh

Population (2016)
  - Total: 390
- Time zone: UTC+3:30 (IRST)

Shurgol (Persian: شورگل) (Note: Also romanized as Shūr Gol and Shūrgol; also known as Shor Göl and Shor Gol) is a village in Kenarporuzh Rural District of the Central District in Salmas County, West Azerbaijan province, Iran.

== Population ==
At the time of the 2006 National Census, the village's population was 430 in 119 households. The following census in 2011 counted 411 people in 129 households. The 2016 census showed the population as 390 people in 118 households.
