= Zanglan =

Village in West Azerbaijan province, Iran

Zanglan Persian: زنگلان
- Village
- Location within Iran
- Coordinates: 37°30′11″N 44°48′51″E
- Country: Iran
- Province: West Azerbaijan
- County: Urmia
- District: Silvaneh
- Rural District: Dasht

Population (2016)
  - Total: 356
- Time zone: UTC+3:30 (IRST)

Zanglan (Persian: زنگلان, romanized: Zanglān; Syriac: Zangīlan) is a village in Dasht Rural District of Silvaneh District in Urmia County, West Azerbaijan province, Iran.

== History ==
Zangīlan was inhabited by 10 Church of the East Christian families with 1 church in 1877, as per Edward Lewes Cutts. It was located in the Tergāwār district.

== Demographics ==
=== Population ===
At the time of the 2006 National Census, the village's population was 330 in 54 households. The following census in 2011 counted 361 people in 56 households. The 2016 census measured the population of the village as 356 people in 66 households.

== Bibliography ==
- Wilmshurst, David (2000). The Ecclesiastical Organisation of the Church of the East, 1318–1913 (PDF). Peeters Publishers.
