= Tuli, Iran =

Village in West Azerbaijan province, Iran

Tuli Persian: تولي
- Village
- Location within Iran
- Coordinates: 37°29′57″N 44°47′16″E
- Country: Iran
- Province: West Azerbaijan
- County: Urmia
- District: Silvaneh
- Rural District: Dasht

Population (2016)
  - Total: 595
- Time zone: UTC+3:30 (IRST)

Tuli (Persian: تولي) (Note: Also romanized as Tūlī; also known as Talū (تلو)) is a village in Dasht Rural District of Silvaneh District in Urmia County, West Azerbaijan province, Iran.

== Demographics ==
=== Population ===
At the time of the 2006 National Census, the village's population was 621 in 103 households. The following census in 2011 counted 598 people in 140 households. The 2016 census measured the population of the village as 595 people in 125 households.
