= Darband, Silvaneh =

Village in West Azerbaijan province, Iran

Darband Persian: دربند
- Village
- Location within Iran
- Coordinates: 37°28′49″N 44°46′35″E
- Country: Iran
- Province: West Azerbaijan
- County: Urmia
- District: Silvaneh
- Rural District: Dasht

Population (2016)
  - Total: 583
- Time zone: UTC+3:30 (IRST)

Darband (Persian: دربند) is a village in Dasht Rural District of Silvaneh District in Urmia County, West Azerbaijan province, Iran.

== Demographics ==
=== Population ===
At the time of the 2006 National Census, the village's population was 465 in 85 households. The following census in 2011 counted 522 people in 114 households. The 2016 census measured the population of the village as 583 people in 126 households.
