= Nergi =

Village in West Azerbaijan province, Iran

Nergi Persian: نرگي
- Village
- Location within Iran
- Coordinates: 37°20′11″N 44°55′16″E
- Country: Iran
- Province: West Azerbaijan
- County: Urmia
- District: Silvaneh
- Rural District: Margavar

Population (2016)
  - Total: 1,069
- Time zone: UTC+3:30 (IRST)

Nergi (Persian: نرگي, romanized: Nergī; Syriac: Nargi) is a village in Margavar Rural District of Silvaneh District in Urmia County, West Azerbaijan province, Iran.

== History ==
Nargi was inhabited by 2 Church of the East Christian families with no church in 1877 as per Edward Lewes Cutts. It was located in the Tergāwār district.

== Demographics ==
=== Population ===
At the time of the 2006 National Census, the village's population was 974 in 160 households. The following census in 2011 counted 1,075 people in 241 households. The 2016 census measured the population of the village as 1,069 people in 280 households.

== Bibliography ==
- Wilmshurst, David (2000). The Ecclesiastical Organisation of the Church of the East, 1318–1913 (PDF). Peeters Publishers.
