= Halaj =

Village in West Azerbaijan province, Iran

Halaj Persian: حلج
- Village
- Location within Iran
- Coordinates: 37°16′20″N 44°51′52″E
- Country: Iran
- Province: West Azerbaijan
- County: Urmia
- District: Silvaneh
- Rural District: Margavar

Population (2016)
  - Total: 1,272
- Time zone: UTC+3:30 (IRST)

Halaj (Persian: حلج) (Note: Also romanized as Ḩalaj; also known as Khalaj) is a village in Margavar Rural District of Silvaneh District in Urmia County, West Azerbaijan province, Iran.

== Demographics ==
=== Population ===
At the time of the 2006 National Census, the village's population was 1,088 in 177 households. The following census in 2011 counted 1,162 people in 238 households. The 2016 census measured the population of the village as 1,272 people in 290 households.
