= Cherikabad =

Village in West Azerbaijan province, Iran

Cherikabad Persian: چريك اباد
- Village
- Location within Iran
- Coordinates: 37°10′45″N 44°55′46″E
- Country: Iran
- Province: West Azerbaijan
- County: Urmia
- District: Silvaneh
- Rural District: Margavar

Population (2016)
  - Total: 1,491
- Time zone: UTC+3:30 (IRST)

Cherikabad (Persian: چريك اباد) (Note: Also romanized as Cherīkābād) is a village in Margavar Rural District of Silvaneh District in Urmia County, West Azerbaijan province, Iran.

== Demographics ==
=== Population ===
At the time of the 2006 National Census, the village's population was 1,174 in 213 households. The following census in 2011 counted 976 people in 200 households. The 2016 census measured the population of the village as 1,491 people in 336 households.
