= Dazgir =

Village in West Azerbaijan province, Iran

Dazgir Persian: دزگير
- Village
- Location within Iran
- Coordinates: 37°21′45″N 44°51′38″E
- Country: Iran
- Province: West Azerbaijan
- County: Urmia
- District: Silvaneh
- Rural District: Dasht

Population (2016)
  - Total: 567
- Time zone: UTC+3:30 (IRST)

Dazgir (Persian: دزگير, romanized: Dazgīr; Syriac: Dīzgārī) (Note: Also known as Dezgir, Dazgiri, and Dezgar.) is a village in Dasht Rural District of Silvaneh District in Urmia County, West Azerbaijan province, Iran.

== History ==
The priest Wardā, son of the priest Mirzā, son of the priest Hormizd, nephew of the priest Sulāqā, first cousin of the bishop Yōḥannān of Anzel, copied a manuscript at the Church of Mār Giwārgīs at Dīzgārī in 1761. Dīzgārī was inhabited by 20 Church of the East Christian families with 1 church in 1877, as per Edward Lewes Cutts. It was located in the Tergāwār district.

== Demographics ==
=== Population ===
At the time of the 2006 National Census, the village's population was 525 in 92 households. The following census in 2011 counted 542 people in 124 households. The 2016 census measured the population of the village as 567 people in 120 households.

== Bibliography ==
- Wilmshurst, David (2000). The Ecclesiastical Organisation of the Church of the East, 1318–1913 (PDF). Peeters Publishers.
