= Balakan =

Balakan may refer to:

- Balakən, Azerbaijan
- Balakan District, Azerbaijan
- Balakan, Qazvin, Iran
- Balakan, West Azerbaijan, Iran
