= Shenatal-e Olya =

Village in West Azerbaijan province, Iran

Shenatal-e Olya Persian: شناتال عليا
- Village
- Location within Iran
- Coordinates: 38°04′37″N 44°30′03″E
- Country: Iran
- Province: West Azerbaijan
- County: Salmas
- District: Kuhsar
- Rural District: Chahriq

Population (2016)
  - Total: 368
- Time zone: UTC+3:30 (IRST)

Shenatal-e Olya (Persian: شناتال عليا) (Note: Also romanized as Shenātāl-e ‘Olyā; also known as Shenātāl) is a village in Chahriq Rural District of Kuhsar District in Salmas County, West Azerbaijan province, Iran.

== Demographics ==
=== Population ===
At the time of the 2006 National Census, the village's population was 359 in 67 households. The following census in 2011 counted 370 people in 80 households. The 2016 census measured the population of the village as 368 people in 87 households.
