= Ziveh, Silvaneh =

Village in West Azerbaijan province, Iran

Ziveh Persian: زيوه
- Village
- Location within Iran
- Coordinates: 37°15′03″N 44°54′17″E
- Country: Iran
- Province: West Azerbaijan
- County: Urmia
- District: Silvaneh
- Rural District: Margavar

Population (2016)
  - Total: 1,200
- Time zone: UTC+3:30 (IRST)

Ziveh (Persian: زيوه) (Note: Also romanized as Zīveh; also known as Qal‘eh-ye Zīveh and Qal‘eh Zeva) is a village in, and the capital of, Margavar Rural District in Silvaneh District of Urmia County, West Azerbaijan province, Iran.

== Demographics ==
=== Population ===
At the time of the 2006 National Census, the village's population was 987 in 188 households. The following census in 2011 counted 1,017 people in 193 households. The 2016 census measured the population of the village as 1,200 people in 323 households.
