= Razhan =

Village in West Azerbaijan province, Iran

Razhan Persian: راژان
- Village
- Location within Iran
- Coordinates: 37°22′55″N 44°52′04″E
- Country: Iran
- Province: West Azerbaijan
- County: Urmia
- District: Silvaneh
- Rural District: Dasht

Population (2016)
  - Total: 3,783
- Time zone: UTC+3:30 (IRST)

Razhan (Persian: راژان) (Note: Also romanized as Rāzhān) is a village in, and the capital of, Dasht Rural District in Silvaneh District of Urmia County, West Azerbaijan province, Iran.

== Demographics ==
=== Population ===
At the time of the 2006 National Census, the village's population was 2,711 in 526 households. The following census in 2011 counted 2,775 people in 637 households. The 2016 census measured the population of the village as 3,783 people in 958 households. It was the most populous village in its rural district.
