= Tamar, West Azerbaijan =

Village in West Azerbaijan province, Iran

Tamar Persian: تمر
- Village
- Location within Iran
- Coordinates: 38°07′00″N 44°52′57″E
- Country: Iran
- Province: West Azerbaijan
- County: Salmas
- District: Central
- Rural District: Kenarporuzh

Population (2016)
  - Total: 860
- Time zone: UTC+3:30 (IRST)

Tamar (Persian: تمر) (Note: Armenian: Տամբեր) is a village in, and the capital of, Kenarporuzh Rural District in the Central District of Salmas County, West Azerbaijan province, Iran.

== Demographics ==
=== Population ===
At the time of the 2006 National Census, the village's population was 1,064 in 243 households. The following census in 2011 counted 1,091 people in 321 households. The 2016 census showed the population as 860 people in 245 households. It was the most populous village in its rural district.
