= Gowjar, West Azerbaijan =

Village in West Azerbaijan province, Iran

Gowjar Persian: گوجار
- Village
- Location within Iran
- Coordinates: 37°29′14″N 44°50′03″E
- Country: Iran
- Province: West Azerbaijan
- County: Urmia
- District: Silvaneh
- Rural District: Dasht

Population (2016)
  - Total: 988
- Time zone: UTC+3:30 (IRST)

Gowjar (Persian: گوجار) (Note: Also romanized as Gowjār; also known as Gowjāz) is a village in Dasht Rural District of Silvaneh District in Urmia County, West Azerbaijan province, Iran.

== Demographics ==
=== Population ===
At the time of the 2006 National Census, the village's population was 910 in 156 households. The following census in 2011 counted 948 people in 224 households. The 2016 census measured the population of the village as 988 people in 177 households.
