= Hashemabad, West Azerbaijan =

Village in West Azerbaijan province, Iran

Hashemabad Persian: هاشم اباد
- Village
- Location within Iran
- Coordinates: 37°16′47″N 44°53′58″E
- Country: Iran
- Province: West Azerbaijan
- County: Urmia
- District: Silvaneh
- Rural District: Margavar

Population (2016)
  - Total: 1,209
- Time zone: UTC+3:30 (IRST)

Hashemabad (Persian: هاشم اباد, romanized: Hāshemābād; Syriac: Heshmāwā) is a village in Margavar Rural District of Silvaneh District in Urmia County, West Azerbaijan province, Iran.

== History ==
Heshmāwā was inhabited by 7 Church of the East Christian families with 1 church in 1877, as per Edward Lewes Cutts. It was located in the Tergāwār district.

== Demographics ==
=== Population ===
At the time of the 2006 National Census, the village's population was 1,024 in 184 households. The following census in 2011 counted 1,144 people in 283 households. The 2016 census measured the population of the village as 1,209 people in 310 households.

== Bibliography ==
- Wilmshurst, David (2000). The Ecclesiastical Organisation of the Church of the East, 1318–1913 (PDF). Peeters Publishers.
