= Derik (disambiguation) =

Derik may refer to:

- Derik (name), an alternative spelling of the name Derek
- Derik, a city in Syria, also known as Al-Malikiyah
- Derik, Turkey, a city in Turkey
- Derik, West Azerbaijan, a village in West Azerbaijan Province, Iran

== See also ==
- Daryek, Mazandaran, a village in Mazandaran Province, Iran
- Derick, a name
