= Sheykh Shamzin =

Village in West Azerbaijan province, Iran

Sheykh Shamzin Persian: شيخ شمزين
- Village
- Location within Iran
- Coordinates: 37°31′42″N 44°49′55″E
- Country: Iran
- Province: West Azerbaijan
- County: Urmia
- District: Silvaneh
- Rural District: Targavar

Population (2016)
  - Total: 481
- Time zone: UTC+3:30 (IRST)

Sheykh Shamzin (Persian: شيخ شمزين) (Note: Also romanized as Sheykh Shamzīn) is a village in Targavar Rural District of Silvaneh District in Urmia County, West Azerbaijan province, Iran.

== Demographics ==
=== Population ===
At the time of the 2006 National Census, the village's population was 413 in 70 households. The following census in 2011 counted 483 people in 91 households. The 2016 census measured the population of the village as 481 people in 93 households.
