= Guzik, Shepiran =

Village in West Azerbaijan province, Iran

Guzik Persian: گوزيك
- Village
- Location within Iran
- Coordinates: 37°58′48″N 44°25′54″E
- Country: Iran
- Province: West Azerbaijan
- County: Salmas
- District: Kuhsar
- Rural District: Shepiran

Population (2016)
  - Total: 355
- Time zone: UTC+3:30 (IRST)

Guzik (Persian: گوزيك) (Note: Also romanized as Gūzīk) is a village in Shepiran Rural District of Kuhsar District in Salmas County, West Azerbaijan province, Iran.

== Demographics ==
=== Population ===
At the time of the 2006 National Census, the village's population was 286 in 42 households. The following census in 2011 counted 208 people in 36 households. The 2016 census measured the population of the village as 355 people in 68 households.
