= Bavan, Silvaneh =

Village in West Azerbaijan province, Iran

Bavan Persian: باوان
- Village
- Location within Iran
- Coordinates: 37°12′00″N 44°57′48″E
- Country: Iran
- Province: West Azerbaijan
- County: Urmia
- District: Silvaneh
- Rural District: Margavar

Population (2016)
  - Total: 1,281
- Time zone: UTC+3:30 (IRST)

Bavan (Persian: باوان) (Note: Also romanized as Bāvān) is a village in Margavar Rural District of Silvaneh District in Urmia County, West Azerbaijan province, Iran.

== Demographics ==
=== Population ===
At the time of the 2006 National Census, the village's population was 1,106 in 208 households. The following census in 2011 counted 1,199 people in 239 households. The 2016 census measured the population of the village as 1,281 people in 264 households.
