= Kayer =

Village in West Azerbaijan province, Iran

Kayer Persian: كاير
- Village
- Location within Iran
- Coordinates: 37°15′12″N 44°55′44″E
- Country: Iran
- Province: West Azerbaijan
- County: Urmia
- District: Silvaneh
- Rural District: Margavar

Population (2016)
  - Total: 1,206
- Time zone: UTC+3:30 (IRST)

Kayer (Persian: كاير) (Note: Also romanized as Kāyer) is a village in Margavar Rural District of Silvaneh District in Urmia County, West Azerbaijan province, Iran.

== Demographics ==
=== Population ===
At the time of the 2006 National Census, the village's population was 1,059 in 180 households. The following census in 2011 counted 1,061 people in 261 households. The 2016 census measured the population of the village as 1,206 people in 283 households.
