= Berasb =

Village in West Azerbaijan province, Iran

Berasb Persian: براسب
- Village
- Location within Iran
- Coordinates: 37°14′08″N 44°52′25″E
- Country: Iran
- Province: West Azerbaijan
- County: Urmia
- District: Silvaneh
- Rural District: Margavar

Population (2016)
  - Total: 1,031
- Time zone: UTC+3:30 (IRST)

Berasb (Persian: براسب) (Note: Also romanized as Berāsb) is a village in Margavar Rural District of Silvaneh District in Urmia County, West Azerbaijan province, Iran.

== Demographics ==
=== Population ===
At the time of the 2006 National Census, the village's population was 815 in 117 households. The following census in 2011 counted 978 people in 219 households. The 2016 census measured the population of the village as 1,031 people in 259 households.
