= Harakian =

Harakian or Harkian (Persian: هركيان) may refer to:

- Harkian, Gilan
- Harakian, West Azerbaijan
