= Kay, Iran =

Village in West Azerbaijan province, Iran

Kay Persian: كاي
- Village
- Location within Iran
- Coordinates: 37°27′12″N 44°48′29″E
- Country: Iran
- Province: West Azerbaijan
- County: Urmia
- District: Silvaneh
- Rural District: Dasht

Population (2016)
  - Total: 381
- Time zone: UTC+3:30 (IRST)

Kay (Persian: كاي) (Note: Also romanized as Kāy; also known as Kā'ī) is a village in Dasht Rural District of Silvaneh District in Urmia County, West Azerbaijan province, Iran.

== Demographics ==
=== Population ===
At the time of the 2006 National Census, the village's population was 299 in 45 households. The following census in 2011 counted 325 people in 84 households. The 2016 census measured the population of the village as 381 people in 99 households.
