= Khvoshaku =

Village in West Azerbaijan province, Iran

Khvoshaku Persian: خوشاكو
- Village
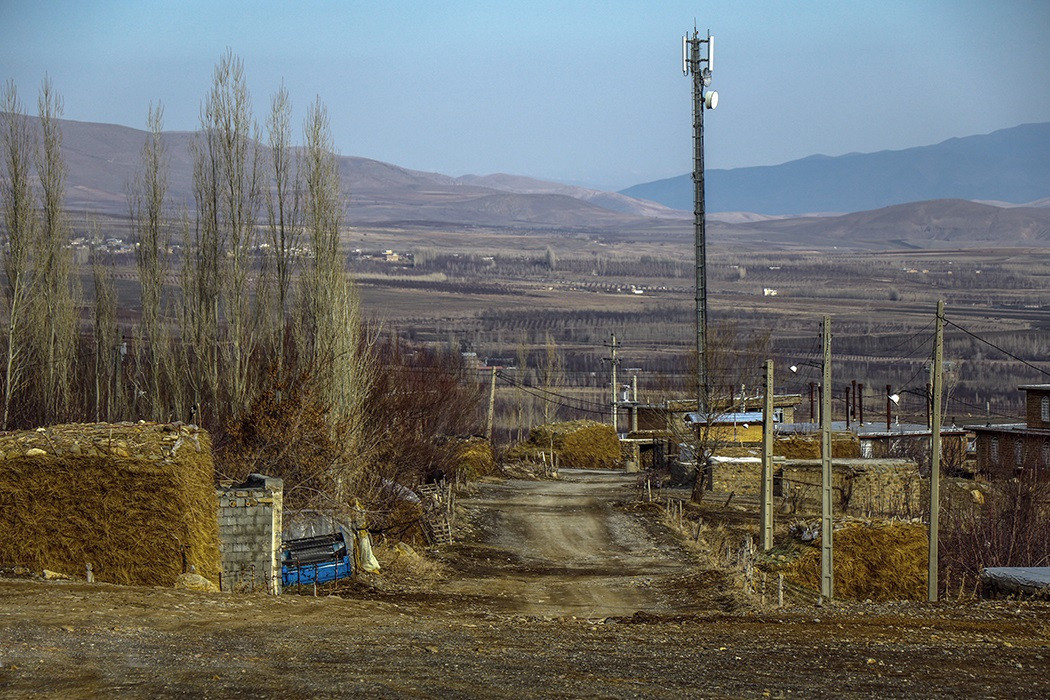
- The village of Khvoshaku

- Location within Iran
- Coordinates: 37°27′56″N 44°46′59″E
- Country: Iran
- Province: West Azerbaijan
- County: Urmia
- District: Silvaneh
- Rural District: Dasht

Population (2016)
  - Total: 616
- Time zone: UTC+3:30 (IRST)

Khvoshaku (Persian: خوشاكو) (Note: Also romanized as Khvoshākū; also known as Khvoshālū) is a village in Dasht Rural District of Silvaneh District in Urmia County, West Azerbaijan province, Iran.

== Demographics ==
=== Population ===
At the time of the 2006 National Census, the village's population was 476 in 78 households. The following census in 2011 counted 669 people in 136 households. The 2016 census measured the population of the village as 616 people in 116 households.
