= Gerdevan =

Village in West Azerbaijan province, Iran

Gerdevan Persian: گردوان
- Village
- Location within Iran
- Coordinates: 37°14′26″N 44°56′36″E
- Country: Iran
- Province: West Azerbaijan
- County: Urmia
- District: Silvaneh
- Rural District: Margavar

Population (2016)
  - Total: 1,342
- Time zone: UTC+3:30 (IRST)

Gerdevan (Persian: گردوان) (Note: Also romanized as Gerdevān) is a village in Margavar Rural District of Silvaneh District in Urmia County, West Azerbaijan province, Iran.

== Demographics ==
=== Population ===
At the time of the 2006 National Census, the village's population was 1,259 in 211 households. The following census in 2011 counted 1,314 people in 291 households. The 2016 census measured the population of the village as 1,342 people in 306 households.
