= Nushan-e Olya =

Nushan-e Olya نوشان عليا
- Village
- Location within Iran
- Coordinates: 37°27′53″N 44°55′14″E
- Country: Iran
- Province: West Azerbaijan
- County: Urmia
- Bakhsh: Silvaneh
- Rural District: Dasht

Population (2006)
  - Total: 180
- Time zone: UTC+3:30 (IRST)
  - Summer (DST): UTC+4:30 (IRDT)

Nushan-e Olya (Persian: نوشان عليا, also Romanized as Nūshān-e ‘Olyā; also known as Nūshān) is a village in Dasht Rural District, Silvaneh District, Urmia County, West Azerbaijan Province, Iran. At the 2006 census, its population was 180, in 37 families.
