= Balakan, Iran =

Balakan (Persian: بالكان or بلكان) may refer to:

- Balakan, Qazvin (بلكان - Balakān)
- Balakan, West Azerbaijan (بالكان - Bālakān)
