= Khenavin =

Village in West Azerbaijan province, Iran

Khenavin Persian: خناوين
- Village
- Location within Iran
- Coordinates: 38°02′16″N 44°23′34″E
- Country: Iran
- Province: West Azerbaijan
- County: Salmas
- District: Kuhsar
- Rural District: Shepiran

Population (2016)
  - Total: 320
- Time zone: UTC+3:30 (IRST)

Khenavin (Persian: خناوين) (Note: Also romanized as Khanāvīn and Khenāvīn) is a village in Shepiran Rural District of Kuhsar District in Salmas County, West Azerbaijan province, Iran.

== Demographics ==
=== Population ===
At the time of the 2006 National Census, the village's population was 424 in 70 households. The following census in 2011 counted 120 people in 22 households. The 2016 census measured the population of the village as 320 people in 61 households.
