= Silvaneh =

City in West Azerbaijan province, Iran

Silvaneh Persian: سيلوانه
- City
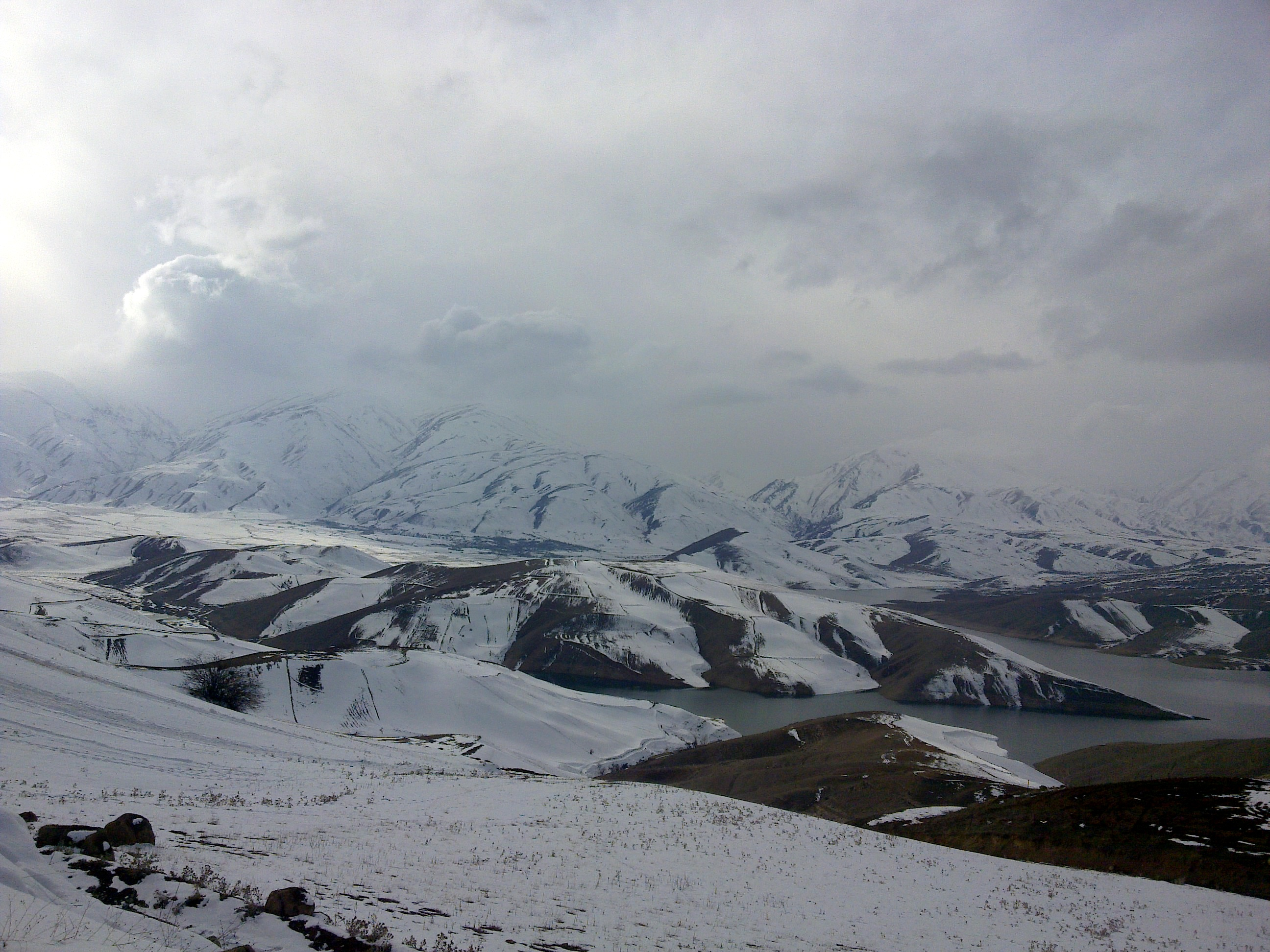
- Snow-covered peaks in Silvaneh

- Location within Iran
- Coordinates: 37°25′17″N 44°51′16″E
- Country: Iran
- Province: West Azerbaijan
- County: Urmia
- District: Silvaneh
- Established as a city: 2000

Population (2016)
  - Total: 1,614
- Time zone: UTC+3:30 (IRST)

Silvaneh (Kurdish: سیلڤانێه, Persian: سيلوانه) (Note: Also romanized as Sīlvāneh; also known as Salvanagh, Selvānā, Selvānaq, Silvana, and Sīlvānā) is a city in, and the capital of, Silvaneh District of Urmia County, West Azerbaijan province, Iran. The village of Silvaneh was converted to a city in 2000.

== Demographics ==
=== Population ===
At the time of the 2006 National Census, the city's population was 1,350 in 243 households. The following census in 2011 counted 1,490 people in 396 households. The 2016 census measured the population of the city as 1,614 people in 436 households.
