= Qasrik, Sumay-ye Jonubi =

Qasrik قصريك
- Village
- Location within Iran
- Coordinates: 37°52′46″N 44°20′29″E
- Country: Iran
- Province: West Azerbaijan
- County: Urmia
- Bakhsh: Sumay-ye Beradust
- Rural District: Sumay-ye Jonubi

Population (2006)
  - Total: 524
- Time zone: UTC+3:30 (IRST)
  - Summer (DST): UTC+4:30 (IRDT)

Qasrik (Persian: قصريك, also Romanized as Qaşrīk) is a village in Sumay-ye Jonubi Rural District, Sumay-ye Beradust District, Urmia County, West Azerbaijan Province, Iran. At the 2006 census, its population was 524, in 93 families.
