= Margavar Rural District =

Rural district in West Azerbaijan province, Iran

Margavar Rural District Persian: دهستان مرگور
- Rural District
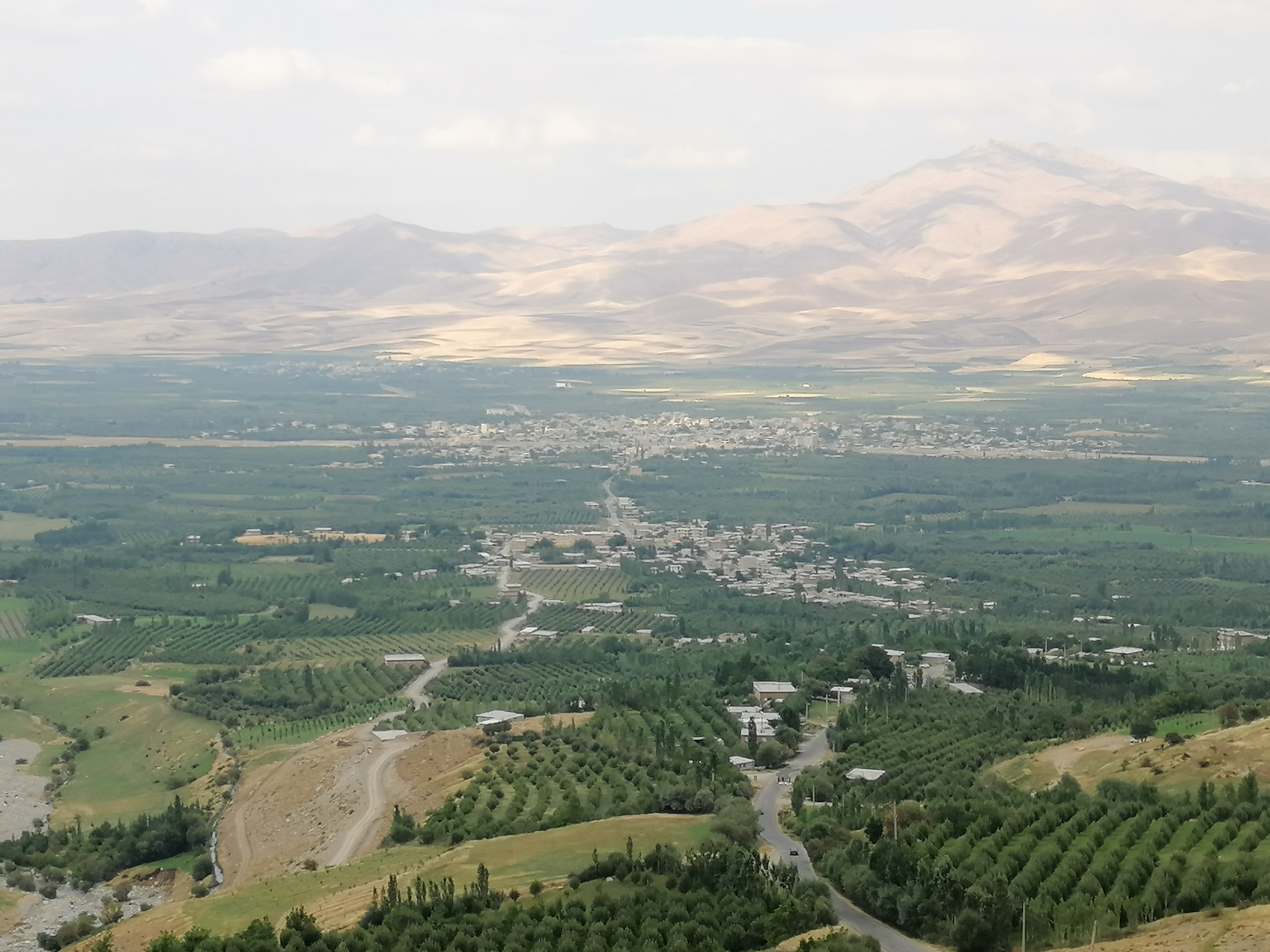
- The village of Dizaj

- Location within Iran
- Coordinates: 37°15′N 44°53′E
- Country: Iran
- Province: West Azerbaijan
- County: Urmia
- District: Silvaneh
- Established: 1987
- Capital: Ziveh

Population (2016)
  - Total: 40,174
- Time zone: UTC+3:30 (IRST)

Margavar Rural District (Persian: دهستان مرگور) is in Silvaneh District of Urmia County, West Azerbaijan province, Iran. Its capital is the village of Ziveh.

== History ==
According to Harry P. Packard of the Board of Foreign Missions of the Presbyterian Church, the rural districts of Dasht, Margavar, and Targavar were destroyed by Turks and Kurds during the Assyrian genocide in events that gave rise to the Assyrian independence movement. Few Assyrians remain in Margavar and the district is mostly populated by Kurds.

== Demographics ==
=== Population ===
At the time of the 2006 National Census, the rural district's population was 34,862 in 6,012 households. There were 37,170 inhabitants in 8,364 households at the following census of 2011. The 2016 census measured the population of the rural district as 40,174 in 9,602 households. The most populous of its 54 villages was Dizaj, with 4,907 people.

=== Other villages in the rural district ===
- Bavan
- Berasb
- Berazan
- Cherikabad
- Gerdevan
- Halaj
- Hashemabad
- Kasian
- Kayer
- Nergi
- Shahrak-e Ziveh
- Zharabad

== See also ==
- Emirate of Bradost
