= Qasrik, Beradust =

Qasrik قصريك
- Village
- Location within Iran
- Coordinates: 37°41′55″N 44°40′10″E
- Country: Iran
- Province: West Azerbaijan
- County: Urmia
- Bakhsh: Sumay-ye Beradust
- Rural District: Beradust

Population (2006)
  - Total: 122
- Time zone: UTC+3:30 (IRST)
  - Summer (DST): UTC+4:30 (IRDT)

Qasrik (Persian: قصريك, also Romanized as Qaşrīk; also known as Qaşrīk-e Barādūst; in Armenian: Կասրիկ) is a village in Beradust Rural District, Sumay-ye Beradust District, Urmia County, West Azerbaijan Province, Iran. At the 2006 census, its population was 122, in 20 families.
