= Bardehsur, Sardasht =

Bardehsur برده سور
- Village
- Location within Iran
- Coordinates: 36°16′58″N 45°24′00″E
- Country: Iran
- Province: West Azerbaijan
- County: Sardasht
- Bakhsh: Vazineh
- Rural District: Melkari

Population (2006)
  - Total: 137
- Time zone: UTC+3:30 (IRST)
  - Summer (DST): UTC+4:30 (IRDT)

Bardehsur (Persian: برده سور, also Romanized as Bardehsūr) is a village in Melkari Rural District, Vazineh District, Sardasht County, West Azerbaijan Province, Iran. At the 2006 census, its population was 137, in 22 families.
