= Bani, Iran =

Village in West Azerbaijan province, Iran

Bani Persian: باني
- Village
- Location within Iran
- Coordinates: 37°37′05″N 44°41′56″E
- Country: Iran
- Province: West Azerbaijan
- County: Urmia
- District: Silvaneh
- Rural District: Targavar

Population (2016)
  - Total: 300
- Time zone: UTC+3:30 (IRST)

Bani (Persian: باني) (Note: Also romanized as Bānī) is a village in Targavar Rural District of Silvaneh District in Urmia County, West Azerbaijan province, Iran.

== Demographics ==
=== Population ===
At the time of the 2006 National Census, the village's population was 342 in 62 households. The following census in 2011 counted 400 people in 80 households. The 2016 census measured the population of the village as 300 people in 61 households.
