= Guzik (surname) =

Guzik is a Polish surname meaning "button". Notable people with the surname include:

- Alberto Guzik (1944–2010), Brazilian actor
- Anna Guzik (born 1976), Polish actress
- Grzegorz Guzik (born 1991), Polish biathlete
- Jake Guzik (1886–1956), American mobster
- John Guzik (linebacker) (1936–2012), American football player
- John Guzik (defensive lineman) (born 1962), American football player
- Jolanta Guzik (born 1981), Polish chess master
- Martin Guzik (born 1974), Czech footballer
- Tomasz Guzik (born 1974), Polish scientist
