= Kenarporuzh Rural District =

Rural district in West Azerbaijan province, Iran

Kenarporuzh Rural District Persian: دهستان كنارپروژ
- Rural District
- Location within Iran
- Coordinates: 38°06′N 44°59′E
- Country: Iran
- Province: West Azerbaijan
- County: Salmas
- District: Central
- Established: 1987
- Capital: Tamar

Population (2016)
  - Total: 5,045
- Time zone: UTC+3:30 (IRST)

Kenarporuzh Rural District (Persian: دهستان كنارپروژ) is in the Central District of Salmas County, West Azerbaijan province, Iran. Its capital is the village of Tamar.

== Demographics ==
=== Population ===
At the time of the 2006 National Census, the rural district's population was 6,175 in 1,303 households. There were 5,653 inhabitants in 1,472 households at the following census of 2011. The 2016 census measured the population of the rural district as 5,045 in 1,431 households. The most populous of its 15 villages was Tamar, with 860 people.

=== Other villages in the rural district ===
- Abgarm
- Akhyan
- Aq Ziarat
- Khan Takhti
- Minas
- Moghul
- Shurgol
- Zindasht
