= Sheyvar =

Sheyvar شيور
- Village
- Location within Iran
- Coordinates: 31°51′27″N 59°55′21″E
- Country: Iran
- Province: South Khorasan
- County: Nehbandan
- Bakhsh: Shusef
- Rural District: Shusef

Population (2006)
  - Total: 20
- Time zone: UTC+3:30 (IRST)
  - Summer (DST): UTC+4:30 (IRDT)

Sheyvar (Persian: شيور, also Romanized as Shīvar; also known as Shīveh) is a village in Shusef Rural District, Shusef District, Nehbandan County, South Khorasan Province, Iran. At the 2006 census, its population was 20, in 7 families.
