= Gerdian, Hamadan =

Gerdian گرديان
- Village
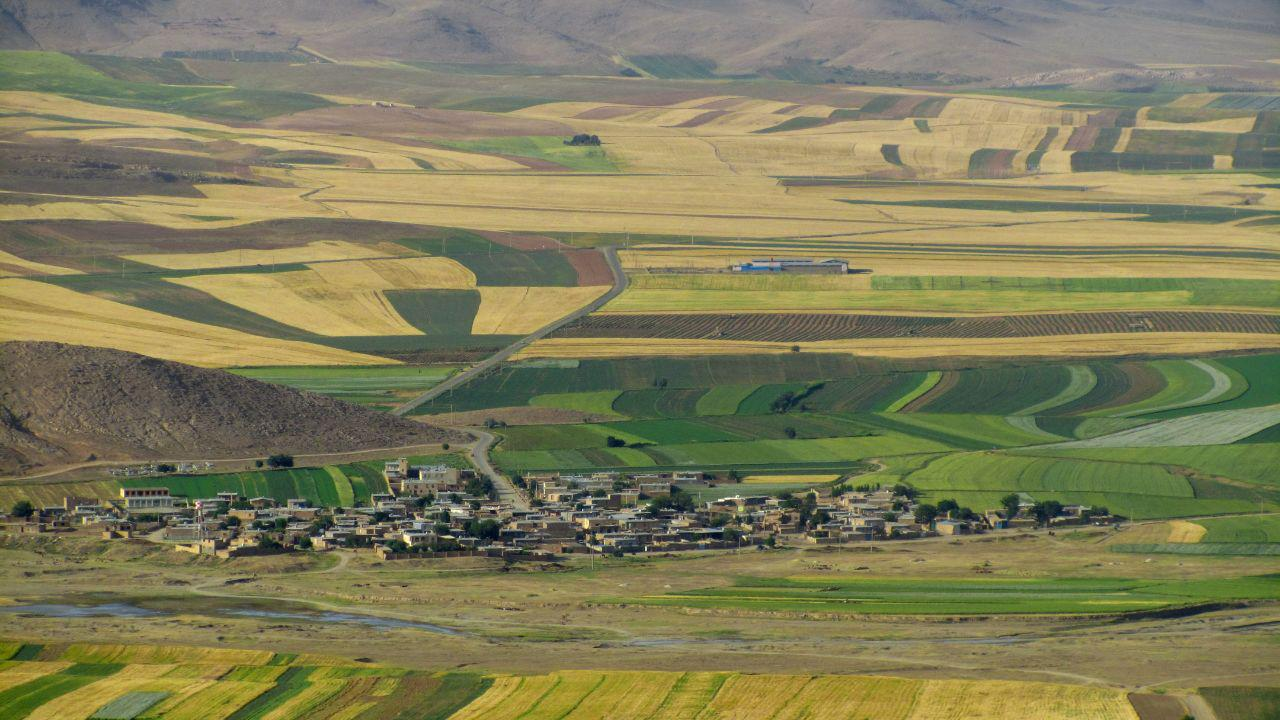
- Gerdian, Khezel-e Sharqi Rural District, Khezel District, Nahavand County, Hamadan Province, Iran

- Location within Iran
- Coordinates: 34°19′33″N 48°03′13″E
- Country: Iran
- Province: Hamadan
- County: Nahavand
- Bakhsh: Khezel
- Rural District: Khezel-e Sharqi

Population (2006)
  - Total: 602
- Time zone: UTC+3:30 (IRST)
  - Summer (DST): UTC+4:30 (IRDT)

Gerdian (Persian: گرديان, also Romanized as Gerdīān and Gerdeyān; also known as Ḩasanābād and Kordīyān) is a village in Khezel-e Sharqi Rural District, Khezel District, Nahavand County, Hamadan Province, Iran. At the 2006 census, its population was 602, in 145 families.
