= Targavar Rural District =

Rural district in West Azerbaijan province, Iran

Targavar Rural District Persian: دهستان ترگور
- Rural District
- Location within Iran
- Coordinates: 37°35′N 44°44′E
- Country: Iran
- Province: West Azerbaijan
- County: Urmia
- District: Silvaneh
- Established: 1987
- Capital: Mavana

Population (2016)
  - Total: 8,381
- Time zone: UTC+3:30 (IRST)

Targavar Rural District (Persian: دهستان ترگور) is in Silvaneh District of Urmia County, West Azerbaijan province, Iran. Its capital is the village of Mavana.

== History ==
The district was home to a significant Assyrian Christian population before the Assyrian genocide, but is mostly populated by Herki Kurds today.

== Demographics ==
=== Population ===
At the time of the 2006 National Census, the rural district's population was 7,893 in 1,344 households. There were 7,765 inhabitants in 1,603 households at the following census of 2011. The 2016 census measured the population of the rural district as 8,381 in 1,862 households. The most populous of its 39 villages was Mavana, with 1,314 people.

=== Other villages in the rural district ===
- Anbi
- Balowlan
- Bani
- Haki
- Khaneqah
- Kuraneh
- Pesan
- Sheyban
- Sheykh Shamzin
- Tibatan
- Towlaki

== See also ==
- Emirate of Bradost
- Assyrian genocide
- List of Assyrian settlements
- Assyrian homeland
- Margawar
