= Gangachin =

Village in West Azerbaijan province, Iran

Gangachin Persian: گنگچين
- Village
- Location within Iran
- Coordinates: 37°45′20″N 44°39′23″E
- Country: Iran
- Province: West Azerbaijan
- County: Urmia
- District: Sumay-ye Beradust
- Rural District: Beradust

Population (2016)
  - Total: 2,488
- Time zone: UTC+3:30 (IRST)

Gangachin (Persian: گنگچين, romanized: Gangachīn; Syriac: Gangājīn) (Note: Also known as Djandjatchin, Gangechīn, and Gengatchin.) is a village in Beradust Rural District of Sumay-ye Beradust District in Urmia County, West Azerbaijan province, Iran.

== History ==
Gangājīn was inhabited by 10 Church of the East Christian families and did not have a church in 1877, as per Edward Lewes Cutts. It was located in the Tergāwār district. Prior to the First World War, there were 250 Assyrian houses at Gangājīn, as per the list presented by Agha Petros to the Lausanne Peace Conference in 1922.

== Demographics ==
=== Population ===
At the time of the 2006 National Census, the village's population was 2,682 in 472 households. The following census in 2011 counted 2,458 people in 566 households. The 2016 census measured the population of the village as 2,488 people in 546 households. It was the most populous village in its rural district.

== Bibliography ==
- Gaunt, David (2006). Massacres, Resistance, Protectors: Muslim-Christian Relations in Eastern Anatolia during World War I. Gorgias Press.
- Hellot-Bellier, Florence (2017). "The Resistance of Urmia Assyrians to Violence at the Beginning of the Twentieth Century". In David Gaunt; Naures Atto; Soner O. Barthoma (eds.). Let Them Not Return: Sayfo – The Genocide against the Assyrian, Syriac and Chaldean Christians in the Ottoman Empire (PDF). pp. 70–99.
- Wilmshurst, David (2000). The Ecclesiastical Organisation of the Church of the East, 1318–1913 (PDF). Peeters Publishers.
