= Shepiran Rural District =

Rural district in West Azerbaijan province, Iran

Shepiran Rural District Persian: دهستان شپيران
- Rural District
- Location within Iran
- Coordinates: 37°57′N 44°22′E
- Country: Iran
- Province: West Azerbaijan
- County: Salmas
- District: Kuhsar
- Established: 1987
- Capital: Delazi

Population (2016)
  - Total: 8,550
- Time zone: UTC+3:30 (IRST)

Shepiran Rural District (Persian: دهستان شپيران) is in Kuhsar District of Salmas County, West Azerbaijan province, Iran. Its capital is the village of Delazi. The previous capital of the rural district was the village of Shirvani.

== Demographics ==
=== Population ===
At the time of the 2006 National Census, the rural district's population was 10,052 in 1,625 households. There were 8,517 inhabitants in 1,584 households at the following census of 2011. The 2016 census measured the population of the rural district as 8,550 in 1,747 households. The most populous of its 21 villages was Delazi, with 2,039 people.

=== Other villages in the rural district ===
- Dustan
- Guzik
- Harakian
- Heshterak
- Kalik
- Kelah Rash-e Bala
- Khenavin
- Ostunrash
- Shiveh Dar
