= Dasht Rural District (Urmia County) =

Rural district in West Azerbaijan province, Iran

Dasht Rural District Persian: دهستان دشت
- Rural District
- Location within Iran
- Coordinates: 37°25′N 44°47′E
- Country: Iran
- Province: West Azerbaijan
- County: Urmia
- District: Silvaneh
- Established: 1987
- Capital: Razhan

Population (2016)
  - Total: 10,199
- Time zone: UTC+3:30 (IRST)

Dasht Rural District (Persian: دهستان دشت) is in Silvaneh District of Urmia County, West Azerbaijan province, Iran. Its capital is the village of Razhan.

== Demographics ==
=== Population ===
At the time of the 2006 National Census, the rural district's population was 8,647 in 1,541 households. There were 9,012 inhabitants in 2,002 households at the following census of 2011. The 2016 census measured the population of the rural district as 10,199 in 2,302 households. The most populous of its 32 villages was Razhan, with 3,783 people.

=== Other villages in the rural district ===
- Darband
- Dazgir
- Gowjar
- Kay
- Khvoshaku
- Tuli
- Zanglan
