= Shenatal Rural District =

Rural district in West Azerbaijan province, Iran

Shenatal Rural District Persian: دهستان شناتال
- Rural District
- Location within Iran
- Coordinates: 38°11′N 44°30′E
- Country: Iran
- Province: West Azerbaijan
- County: Salmas
- District: Kuhsar
- Established: 1987
- Capital: Kuzehrash

Population (2016)
  - Total: 9,931
- Time zone: UTC+3:30 (IRST)

Shenatal Rural District (Persian: دهستان شناتال) is in Kuhsar District of Salmas County, West Azerbaijan province, Iran. Its capital is the village of Kuzehrash.

== Demographics ==
=== Population ===
At the time of the 2006 National Census, the rural district's population was 10,950 in 1,955 households. There were 9,494 inhabitants in 1,968 households at the following census of 2011. The 2016 census measured the population of the rural district as 9,931 in 2,276 households. The most populous of its 33 villages was Kuzehrash, with 1,501 people.

=== Other villages in the rural district ===
- Ali Bolaghi-ye Olya
- Ashnak
- Berushkhvaran
- Gabrabad
- Hajji Jafan
- Kapik
- Khurkhura
- Nazarabad
- Qezel Kand
- Senji
