= Chahriq Rural District =

Rural district in West Azerbaijan province, Iran

Chahriq Rural District Persian: دهستان چهريق
- Rural District
- Location within Iran
- Coordinates: 38°02′N 44°37′E
- Country: Iran
- Province: West Azerbaijan
- County: Salmas
- District: Kuhsar
- Established: 1987
- Capital: Chahriq-e Olya

Population (2016)
  - Total: 9,435
- Time zone: UTC+3:30 (IRST)

Chahriq Rural District (Persian: دهستان چهريق) is in Kuhsar District of Salmas County, West Azerbaijan province, Iran. Its capital is the village of Chahriq-e Olya.

== Demographics ==
=== Population ===
At the time of the 2006 National Census, the rural district's population was 9,450 in 1,744 households. There were 8,941 inhabitants in 1,855 households at the following census of 2011. The 2016 census measured the population of the rural district as 9,435 in 2,276 households. The most populous of its 47 villages was Chahriq-e Olya, with 831 people.

=== Other villages in the rural district ===
- Ajvaj
- Aslanik
- Garmavich
- Haqvaran
- Hasbasheh
- Lilus
- Shenatal-e Olya
