= Silvaneh District =

District in West Azerbaijan province, Iran

Silvaneh District Persian: بخش سیلوانه
- District
- Location within Iran
- Coordinates: 37°23′N 44°48′E
- Country: Iran
- Province: West Azerbaijan
- County: Urmia
- Capital: Silvaneh

Population (2016)
  - Total: 60,368
- Time zone: UTC+3:30 (IRST)

Silvaneh District (Persian: بخش سیلوانه) is in Urmia County, West Azerbaijan province, Iran. Its capital is the city of Silvaneh.

== Demographics ==
=== Population ===
At the time of the 2006 National Census, the district's population was 52,752 in 9,140 households. The following census in 2011 counted 55,437 people in 12,365 households. The 2016 census measured the population of the district as 60,368 inhabitants in 14,202 households.

=== Administrative divisions ===
Silvaneh District Population
Administrative Divisions	2006	2011	2016
Dasht RD	8,647	9,012	10,199
Margavar RD	34,862	37,170	40,174
Targavar RD	7,893	7,765	8,381
Silvaneh (city)	1,350	1,490	1,614
Total	52,752	55,437	60,368
RD = Rural District
