= Kuhsar District =

District in West Azerbaijan province, Iran

Kuhsar District Persian: بخش کوهسار
- District
- Location within Iran
- Coordinates: 38°05′N 44°29′E
- Country: Iran
- Province: West Azerbaijan
- County: Salmas
- Established: 1997
- Capital: Katban

Population (2016)
  - Total: 27,916
- Time zone: UTC+3:30 (IRST)

Kuhsar District (Persian: بخش کوهسار) is in Salmas County, West Azerbaijan province, Iran. Its capital is the village of Katban.

== Demographics ==
=== Population ===
At the time of the 2006 National Census, the district's population was 30,452 in 5,324 households. The following census in 2011 counted 26,952 people in 5,407 households. The 2016 census measured the population of the district as 27,916 inhabitants in 6,299 households.

=== Administrative divisions ===
Kuhsar District Population
Administrative Divisions	2006	2011	2016
Chahriq RD	9,450	8,941	9,435
Shenatal RD	10,950	9,494	9,931
Shepiran RD	10,052	8,517	8,550
Total	30,452	26,952	27,916
RD = Rural District
