= Salmas County =

County in West Azerbaijan province, Iran

Salmas County Persian: شهرستان سلماس
- County
- Location of Salmas County in West Azerbaijan province (center, purple)

- Location of West Azerbaijan province in Iran
- Coordinates: 38°06′N 44°44′E
- Country: Iran
- Province: West Azerbaijan
- Capital: Salmas
- Districts: Central, Kuhsar

Population (2016)
  - Total: 223,546
- Time zone: UTC+3:30 (IRST)

Salmas County Historical Population
Year	Population	±%
1956	57,961	—
1966	70,824	+22.2%
1976	87,700	+23.8%
1986	127,891	+45.8%
1996	156,558	+22.4%
2006	180,708	+15.4%
2011	192,591	+6.6%
2016	196,546	+2.1%
2021	220,000	+11.9%
Note: The data presented of 1976 and earlier (1956-1976) are from the censuses before Iranian Revolution and the data of 1986 and later (1986-2016) are from the censuses after it. The population of the county for the census 1956 is approximated by about 440% of Salmas's populations censused at the same year. Sources: "Population and Housing Census". Statistical Center of Iran. (used for censuses of 2006 and later), "Population of Salmas County". Salmas Weblog. (used for census of 1996), "Location and Geography of the City". Salmas County Municipality. (used for censuses 1966-1986), "An Analysis to the Urban System of West Azerbaijan Province During the Years 1956 till 2006". Urban Ecology Researches. (used in approximate calculation of the population for the census of 1956). The 2021 census did not occur due to COVID19 and it's a semi-accurate estimation with consideration of (earthquake) migration and birth rate.

Salmas County (Persian: شهرستان سلماس) is in West Azerbaijan province, Iran. Its capital is the city of Salmas.

== Demographics ==
=== Ethnicity ===
The county is populated largely by Azerbaijanis and a smaller minority of Kurds. Also a few hundred Assyrians live in the district, and comprise the second largest population of minorities in the province after Urmia County.

=== Population ===
At the time of the 2006 National Census, the county's population was 180,708 in 40,298 households. The following census in 2011 counted 192,591 people in 48,872 households. The 2016 census measured the population of the county as 196,546 in 53,907 households.

=== Administrative divisions ===
Salmas County's population history and administrative structure over three consecutive censuses are shown in the following table.

Salmas County Population
Administrative Divisions	2006	2011	2016
Central District	150,256	165,639	168,630
Kenarporuzh RD	6,175	5,653	5,045
Koreh Soni RD	19,951	22,300	22,234
Lakestan RD	11,486	11,589	10,387
Zulachay RD	24,868	29,037	29,524
Salmas (city)	79,560	88,196	92,811
Tazeh Shahr (city)	8,216	8,864	8,629
Kuhsar District	30,452	26,952	27,916
Chahriq RD	9,450	8,941	9,435
Shenatal RD	10,950	9,494	9,931
Shepiran RD	10,052	8,517	8,550
Total	180,708	192,591	196,546
RD = Rural District

== See also ==
Media related to Salmas County at Wikimedia Commons
