= List of commanders in the Middle Eastern theatre of World War I =

The list of commanders in the Middle Eastern theatre of World War I gives the engagements and the respected officers during the conflicts.

== Central Powers ==
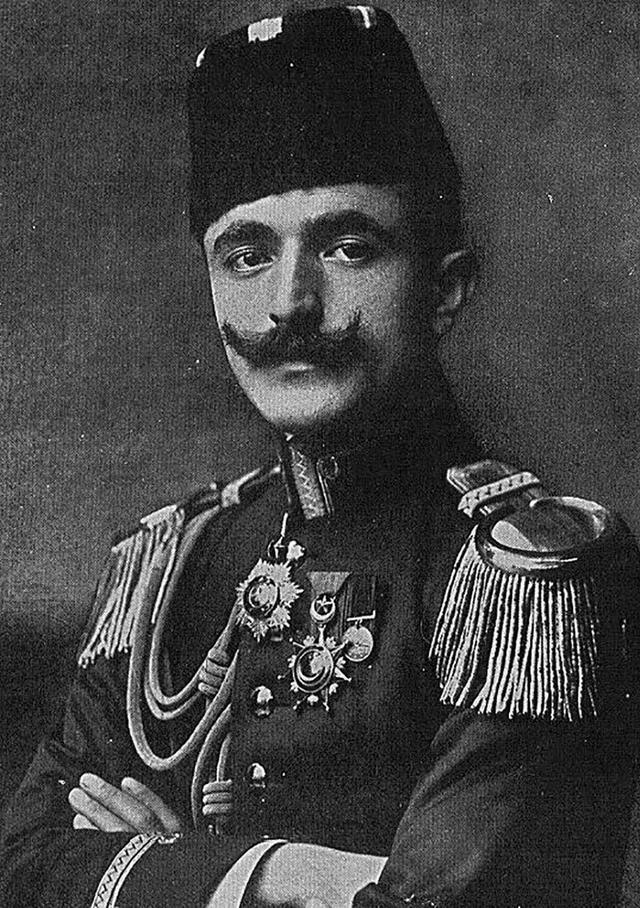
Enver Pasha of the Ottoman Empire.

Commanders-in-chief:

- Ottoman Empire: Deputy commander-in-chief (Başkomutan Vekili) Enver Pasha (1914–1918)

Commanders:

Name	Conflicts
(Ottoman Empire) Enver Pasha	Sarikamish (1914)
(Ottoman Empire) Djemal Pasha	First Suez Offensive, Arab Revolt
(Ottoman Empire) Mehmed Esad Pasha	
(Ottoman Empire) Ahmed Izzet Pasha	Third Army Commander, Second Army Commander
(Ottoman Empire) Djevat Pasha	Dardanelles Campaign
(Ottoman Empire) Hasan Izzet Pasha	
(Ottoman Empire) Mahmud Kâmil Pasha	Third Army Commander in 1916 Battle of Erzurum
(Ottoman Empire) Vehib Pasha	
(Ottoman Empire) Mustafa Fevzi Pasha	Battle of Krithia Vineyard
(Ottoman Empire) Nureddin Pasha	
(Ottoman Empire) Mersinli Djemal Pasha	
(Ottoman Empire) Yakub Shevki Pasha	
(Ottoman Empire) Hafiz Hakki Pasha	Sarikamish (1914), Third Army Commander
(Ottoman Empire) Halil Pasha	
(Ottoman Empire) Nuri Pasha	
(Ottoman Empire) Ali Ihsan Pasha	
(Ottoman Empire) Mustafa Kemal Pasha	Landing at Anzac Cove, Battle of Sari Bair, Battle of Hill 60, Landing at Suvla Bay, Battle of Chunuk Bair, Battle of Scimitar Hill, Battle of the Nek, Battle for Baby 700, Battle for No.3 Post, Battle of Bitlis, Charge at Haritan
(Ottoman Empire) Ali Fuad Pasha	Dardanelles Campaign
(Ottoman Empire) Ismet Bey	
(Ottoman Empire) Sami Bey	Landing at Cape Helles Third Battle of Krithia First Battle of Krithia
(Ottoman Empire) Faik Pasha	Battle of Gully Ravine Battle of Sari Bair
(German Empire) Colmar von der Goltz	
(German Empire) Erich von Falkenhayn	
(German Empire) Otto Liman von Sanders	Dardanelles Campaign
(German Empire) Kress von Kressenstein	
Major Ali Quli Khan Pesyan	Conquest of Shiraz
Captain Gholam Reza Khan Pesyan	Conquest of Shiraz
(German Empire) Georg von Kaunitz	Battle of Qasr-i-Shirin
(German Empire) Colonel Bup	Battle of Qasr-i-Shirin
Major Mohammad Taghi Khan Pesyan	Battle of Musalla, Defense of Hamadan
Heydar Latifiyan	Battle of RobatKarim
Major Azizollah Zarghami	Battle of Musalla, Defense of Hamadan
Major Masoud Kayhan	Battle of Soltanabad
Mirza Kuchik Khan	Battle of Manjil, Battle of Rasht

== Allies ==
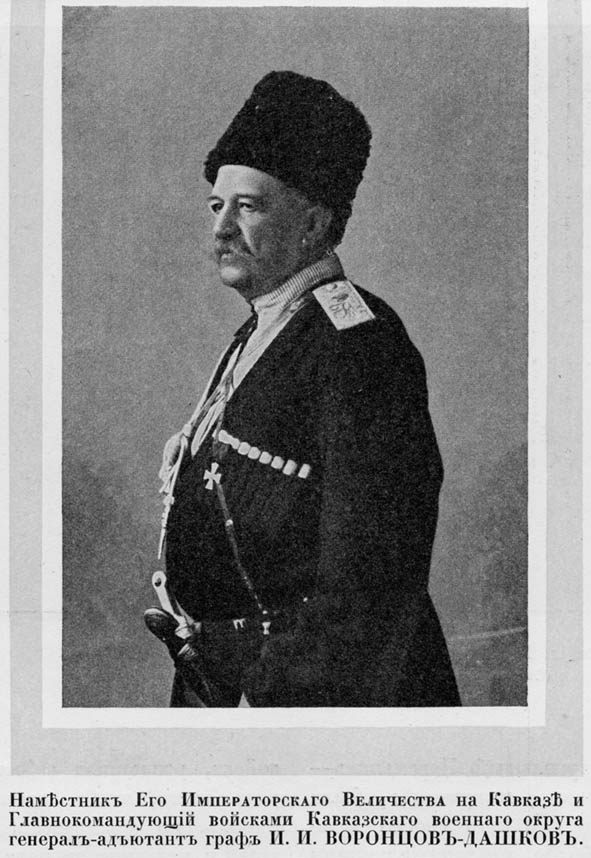
Illarion of Russia.

Commanders-in-chief:

- Russia (Caucasus & Persia): Illarion Ivanovich Vorontsov-Dashkov (1914 – January 1915); Nicholas Nikolaevich (January 1915 – May 1917); Vasily Kharlamov (May 1917 – 1918)
- British:
- Armenia: Tovmas Nazarbekian (1918)

Commanders:

Name	Conflicts
(United Kingdom) Lionel Dunsterville	Battle of Baku
(United Kingdom) Sackville Carden	Naval operations
(United Kingdom) John de Robeck	Naval operations
(United Kingdom) Émile Guépratte	Naval operations
(United Kingdom) Ian Hamilton	Sari Bair
(United Kingdom) Harold Bridgwood Walker	Lone Pine
(United Kingdom) Frederick Stopford	Suvla Bay
(United Kingdom) William Birdwood, 1st Baron Birdwood	Anzac Cove Battle of Hill 60 (Gallipoli)
(United Kingdom) Alexander Godley	Anzac Cove, Chunuk Bair, Sari Bair
(United Kingdom) John Maxwell	Commander of British forces in Egypt; see Raid on the Suez Canal
(United Kingdom) Aylmer Hunter-Weston	Landing at Cape Helles, First Battle of Krithia, Second Battle of Krithia, Third Battle of Krithia, Battle of Gully Ravine
(France) Albert d'Amade	Commander of Expeditionary Corps of the Orient (at Gallipoli)
(France) Henri Gouraud	first Commander of Expeditionary Corps of the Dardanelles
(France) Maurice Bailloud	second Commander of Expeditionary Corps of the Dardanelles
(Russia) Alexander Myshlayevsky	Battle of Sarikamish
(Russia) Nikolai Yudenich	
(Armenia) Andranik Ozanian	Battle of Dilman, Battle of Bitlis
(Armenia) Tovmas Nazarbekian	Battle of Dilman, Battle of Mush, Battle of Bitlis, Battle of Karakilisa, Battle of Sardarabad
(Armenia) Aram Manukian	Siege of Van, Battle of Sardarabad
(Armenia) Garegin Nzhdeh	Armenian battalions, Battle of Karakilisa
(Armenia) Drastamat Kanayan	Battle of Abaran
(Armenia) Movses Silikyan	Battle of Sardarapat
Agha Petros	Hakkari Expedition 1917, Battle of Seray Mountain, Urmia Clashes, Battle of Charah, Battle of Suldouze, Battle of Urmia April 1918, Battle of Urmia June 1918, Battle of Sauj Bulak, Battle of Mosul 1918
Malik Khoshaba	Hakkari Expedition 1916, Hakkari Expedition 1917, Battle of Seray Mountain, Urmia Clashes, Battle of Charah, Battle of Suldouze, Battle of Urmia April 1918, Battle of Urmia June 1918, Battle of Sauj Bulak, Battle of Mosul 1918
Stepan Shahumyan	Battle of Baku
