= Hakkari expedition of 1916 =

1916 Assyrian military expedition

Hakkari Expedition 1916
- Part of Persian campaign (World War I)
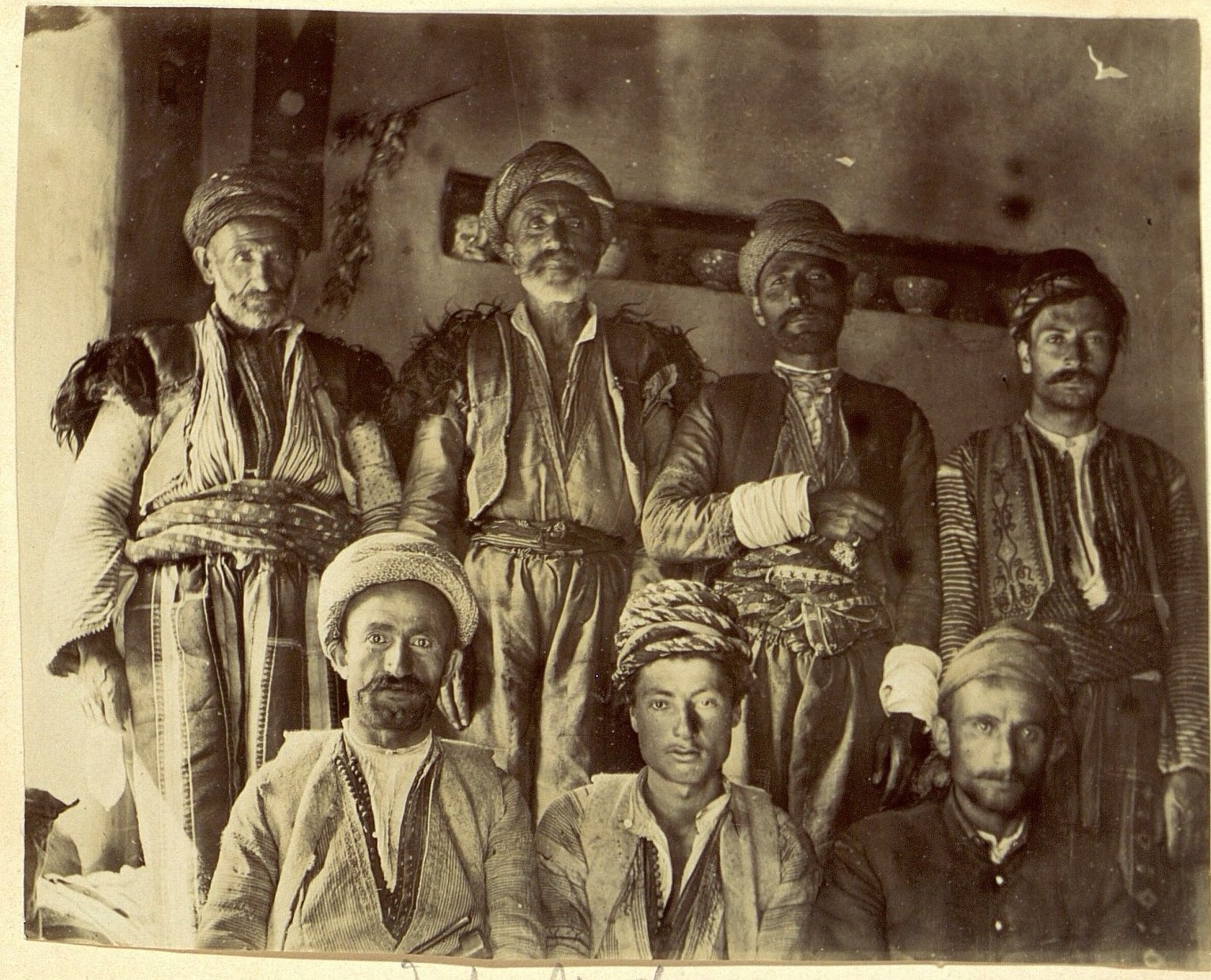
- Assyrians of Hakkari in the early 1900s
Date	21 May 1916 – 29 June 1916
Location	Hakkari, Ottoman Empire
Result	Assyrian victory: Various Kurdish fortresses destroyed; Kurds and Assyrians begin to migrate to Iraq

Belligerents
Assyrian volunteers: Tyari; Baz (tribe)	Ottoman Empire (Kurdistan Region) Hakkari Kurdish tribes

Commanders and leaders
Malik Khoshaba; Dawid Mar Shimun; Agha Petros; Malik Ismail II; Malik Khamoo; Malik Shamizdin; Sawa Matloub	(Kurdistan Region) Kurdish Aghas

The Hakkari expedition of 1916 (21 May–29 June 1916) was a number of raids during World War I conducted by the Assyrian volunteers against local Hakkari Kurdish tribesmen who the year prior, with the help of the Ottoman Empire, expelled the Assyrians from Hakkari, resulting in their settling in Russian-controlled Urmia and its surroundings.

== Preparations for Expedition ==
On May 21, Malik Ismail II and Malik Khoshaba with their fighters left Urmia and the surrounding settlements to Salmas, they arrived the next day and met Dawid Mar Shimun and Malik Shamizdin among other tribal chiefs and their fighters whom had been waiting for the arrival of Ismail and Khoshaba. On May 23, they left to Bashqalan and reached Qudchanis on May 27 and found only a thousand cossacks guarding it.

== Battles in the mountains of Hakkari ==
From Qudchanis the Assyrians split into two branches the first under the leadership of Malik Ismail went to darawa where he met Tyaraye who had re-established themselves in their former villages and the second under Dawid Mar Shimun went on the road to Jurlamerk, they reached Tkhuma and found it in ruins and empty. In Tkhuma both forces met and, after several fierce battles, many inaccessible Kurdish castles and fortresses were destroyed.

Soon after the army returned for Chal, whose fortress was in very mountainous terrain, but after the Assyrians divided themselves in three groups (the first led by Malik Ismail, the second led by Malik Khammo of the Baz tribe and the third led by Malik Shamizdin), the Assyrians attacked all the villages around and looted many sheep and cattle. Dawid Mar Shimun waited until the whole Assyrian force pulled out and the booty from the looting was divided.

== Assyrian retreat into Urmia ==
Before leaving Malik Ismail told the Tyaraye who had reestablished themselves in their homes that the Russian Army had returned from Qudchanis to Bashqalan and that the assyrians that returned to Hakkari wouldn't withstand the Ottomans and Kurds on their own and that it would be best for them to join the Assyrians in Urmia and Salmas. On June 29, all the Assyrian fighters who partook in the expedition returned to Russian occupied Iran.

== See also ==
- Battle of Seray Mountain
- Urmia Clashes
- Battle Charah
- Battle of Suldouze
- Persian Campaign
- Sayfo
- Assyrian Rebellion
- Assyrian Volunteers
- Assyrian Levies
- Mar Benyamin Shimun
- Mar Paulos Shimun
- Agha Petros
- Malik Khoshaba
- Surma Mar Shimun
- Simko Shikak Revolt (1918-1922)
- Simko Shikak Revolt (1926)
