= Battle of Seray Mountain =

1917 battle in Persia during WWI

- Part of Persian campaign (World War I)
Date	5 May 1917 – 13 August 1917
Location	Mavana, Persia
Result	Assyrian victory

Belligerents
Assyrian volunteers: Supporters: Qajar State	Ottoman Empire: 6th Division

Commanders and leaders
Agha Petros; Malik Khoshaba; Malik Khiyo	(Ottoman Empire) Halil Kut (Ottoman Empire) Iskander Pasha (POW)

Strength
1,200	Less than 6,000

Casualties and losses
Unknown	Heavy; 24 officers captured Mountain Cannon captured among other weapons

The Battle of Seray Mountain (5 May – 13 August 1917) took place between the Assyrian Volunteers, led by Agha Petros and Malik Khoshaba, and Ottoman Empire force led by Halil Kut.

== Background ==
In the summer of 1915, the Assyrians of Hakkari successfully stopped the Ottoman army. The Ottomans, unable to break the Assyrians, then brought in heavy artillery and ammunition that, together with an overwhelming advantage in numbers and supplies, eventually overwhelmed the lightly armed and outnumbered Assyrians. Despite the extreme situation, they managed to bring all of their women and flocks and herds safely to Persia. Survivors of fighting age joined the Assyrians of northwest Persia and established an Assyrian army with Russian assistance.

== First phase of battle ==
During the first summer of the arrival of the Assyrian refugees in Persia, the Assyrians of Lower Tyari under the leadership of Malik Khoshaba were settled around the mountains of Seray where they were besieged by Turkish forces under the command of Halil Kut. The Ottoman army was composed of less than 6,000 men thus outnumbering the Assyrian army led by Agha Petros which numbered less than 1,200 troops. Upon their arrival, the Assyrians surprised them, the Turks had come in range of the Assyrians’ machine guns which were hidden behind the rocks of sloping hills and in the bushes. During the night, Malik Khiyo of Ashitha (17 years old at the time) observed two groups crossing his front, positioned himself in an artillery observation post and directed a moonlight strike to hold off the enemy. Two of Khoshaba's patrols were successful in capturing Turkish soldiers to gather intel about their positions. Khoshaba was also successful in preventing the enemy's field guns from damaging his post at dawn, while also bringing in twenty-four Turkish prisoners and personally killing four Turkish soldiers. By 7:30am the enemy was beaten by the men of Khoshaba and Khiyo of Ashitha. Along with the wounded, there were only 24 remaining Turkish officers who were now prisoners.

== Second phase of battle ==
On 13 August 1917, in Seray and Mavana, the Assyrians were surrounded by the 5th and 6th Divisions, under the leadership of Iskander Pasha. Khoshaba decided to withdraw his men to their defences for the night, and to send out patrols to halt the enemy moving towards Seray. By 10:30pm the Assyrians had captured eighty-eight prisoners and a mass of arms. Khoshaba, who could speak fluent Turkish, questioned the prisoners, most of whom claimed no reinforcements would be arriving. Khoshaba also translated a captured code of signals which would call for mortar bombs. Early the following morning, Khoshaba captured more Turkish prisoners; among them was a Turkish army colonel, second in command to Iskander Pasha.

== See also ==
- Sayfo
- Persian Campaign
- Assyrian Volunteers
- Hakkari Expedition 1916
- Hakkari Expedition 1917
- Urmia Clashes
- Battle of Charah
- Battle of Suldouze
- Assyrian Levies
- Assyrian Rebellion
- Mar Benyamin Shimun
- Agha Petros
- Malik Khoshaba
