= Assyrian volunteers =

- The flag that was raised by General Agha Petros Elia of Baz, commander of the Assyrian forces during World War I
- Active: 1914–1920
- Disbanded: 1920
- Allegiance: Entente
- Size: 20,000–25,000 (Assyrians and Armenians): 6,000–8,000 (After World War I)
- Nickname: "The Christian Army of Revenge"
- Engagements: Middle Eastern theatre of World War I: Persian Campaign; Attack Of Baz; Tyari Offensive; Hakkari Expedition 1915; Battle of Urmia 1915; Battle of Apenshai; Battle of Bar Shena; Battle of Bar Shena and Walto; Hakkari Expedition 1916; Hakkari Expedition 1917; Battle of Seray Mountain; Battle of Oramar; Urmia Clashes; Battle of Charah; Battle of Suldouze; Battle of Ushno; Battle of Urmia April 1918; Battle of Urmia June 1918; First Battle of Salmas; Second Battle of Salmas; Battle of Derbend; Capture of Hakkari (1919); Mesopotamian campaign: Battle of Sharqat; Battle of Mosul 1918; Caucasus Campaign: Battle of Bitlis; Defense of Van (1915); Assyrian rebellion Simko Shikak revolt (1918–1922); Simko Shikak revolt (1926)

Commanders
- Notable commanders: Agha Petros; Malik Khoshaba; Dawid Mar Shimun; Mar Shimun Benyamin (spiritual leader); Malik Yaqo

The Assyrian volunteers was an ethnic, but not exclusively, Assyrian military force during World War I, led mainly by General Agha Petros Elia of Baz and several tribal leaders known as Maliks (Syriac: ܡܠܟ) under the spiritual leadership of the Catholicos-Patriarch Mar Shimun Benyamin. The volunteers were allied with the Entente Powers, and described by the English pastor and author William A. Wigram as Our Smallest Ally. They were also dubbed The Christian army of Revenge by the British officer Edward Noel.

== Background ==
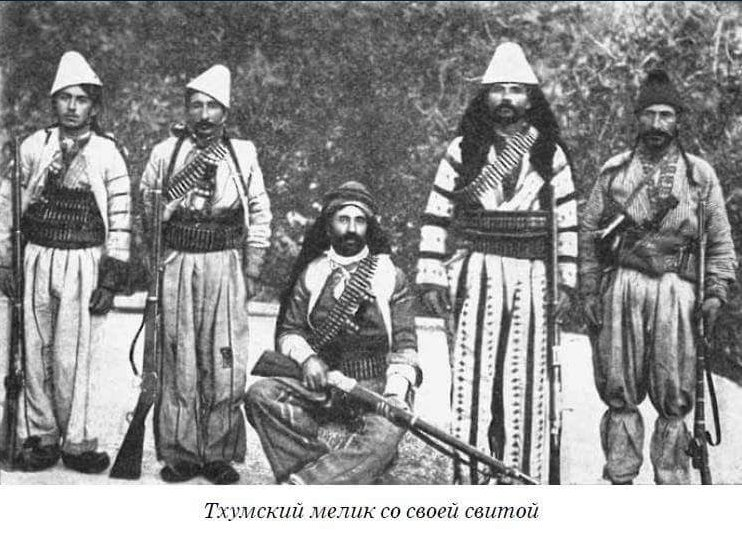
Malik Barkho of Lower Tyareh with his retinue c. 1913

Prior to World War I, the Assyrian tribes of the Hakkari mountains enjoyed complete and semi-independence, each tribe was led by a Malik (ܡܠܟ) who also functioned as a military leader during wartime. The independent Assyrian mountaineers were referred to as Asiratte or Asherat.

The country of the independent Assyrian tribes of Bet Tkhuma, Bet Baz, Bet Jelu, Bet Tyari, Bet Kasrani and Bet Diz occupied the upper valley of the Zab River. This country was known as Hakkari. The village of Mellawa marked the border between the independent and semi-independent tribes.

The British diplomat James Rich wrote:

To reach Asia Minor by this route he (the envoy) would have to pass through the wild and inaccessible country of the Chaldean Christian Tribes who, I believe are the only Christians in the East who have maintained their independence against the Mohammedans, to whom they have rendered themselves very formidable. The men are all remarkable for their strength, size and bravery, and it is said to be less safe to pass among them than through the Mohamadean tribes. They inhabit the country between Amadia and Julamerk.

In reaction to the Assyrian Genocide and lured by British and Russian promises of an independent nation, as the Assyrians armed themselves and put up resistance, Talaat Pasha sent the order to permanently drive them from the Hakkari mountains.

The Assyrians led by Agha Petros of Bit-Baz tribe and Malik Khoshaba of the Bit-Tyari tribe, fought alongside the Allies against Ottoman forces in an Assyrian struggle for independence. Despite being heavily outnumbered and outgunned, the Assyrians fought successfully, scoring a number of victories over the Ottomans, Kurdish tribes, and Persian forces (Note: In Urmia clashes). This situation continued until their Russian allies left the war, and Armenian resistance broke, leaving the Assyrians surrounded, isolated and cut off from lines of supply, with many fighting their way to fellow Assyrian communities in Iraq and Syria, which were under British control. The sizable Assyrian presence in south eastern Anatolia which had endured for over four millennia was thus reduced significantly by the end of World War I. Between 275,000 and 300,000 Assyrian civilians were estimated to have been slaughtered by the armies of the Ottoman Empire and their Kurdish allies, totaling up to two-thirds of the entire Assyrian population.

== Engagements ==
Over the summer of 1915 the Assyrians successfully held off the far larger Ottoman army, Kurdish militia and tribal forces fighting with the Ottomans. The Ottomans, unable to break the Assyrians, then brought in heavy artillery and ammunition that, together with an overwhelming advantage in numbers and supplies, eventually overwhelmed the lightly armed and outnumbered Assyrians. The Russian Army Corps had promised reinforcements, which came too late. Assyrians defended themselves against tremendous odds and conducted an orderly retreat. Despite the extreme situation, they managed to bring all of their women and flocks and herds safely to Persia. Survivors of fighting age joined the Assyrians of northwest Persia, northern Iraq and northeast Syria, including those from Salamas and Urmia to form an Assyrian army, and had a real prospect of fighting with the Russians to evict the Ottoman forces from Persia, and historic Assyria.

=== Agha Petros ===
Under the command of Agha Petros, the Assyrians had quite a few successful engagements over the Ottoman forces. Most notably at Suldouze where Petros’ 1,500 horsemen overcame the forces of Kheiri Bey's (8,000 men). Petros also defeated the Ottomans in a major engagement at Sawcubilax and drove them back to Rawandiz.

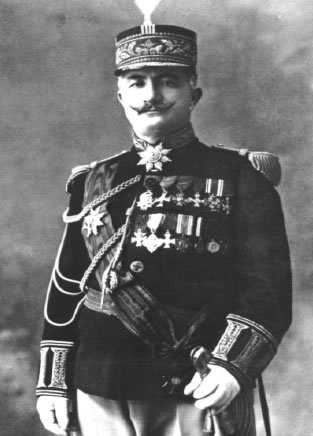
Petros Elia of Baz (Agha Petros)

Agha Petros (with white Cossack hat) waiting for the Persian mullah's white flags of surrender

After the invasion of Mosul by the Young Turks, the Assyrian army, led by General Agha Petros, fought intensively and successfully against the Ottoman army and their Kurdish allies, and pushed them out of Mosul and the whole area, leading to Britain's control of the region. The battles are described in detail by surviving letters of Petros and British officials.

Lieutenant Gasfield (British Liaison Officer) and French Surgeon-Major Jean Caujole (French military physician) personally recorded—in their diaries from the Urmia and Salmas fronts—Agha Petros’s tyrannical rule over his own community and the pressure he exerted to turn villagers into militiamen.

In his book *The Cradle of Mankind: Life in Eastern Kurdistan*, W.A. Wigram states that Petros was involved in fraudulent activities in British Columbia and had collected money under the pretext of building an orphanage in Macedonia. According to some historians, he fled the country just as the Canadian police were about to arrest him and subsequently went to Rome, where he presented himself as a Syriac tribal leader seeking to bring his tribe—originally of the Church of the East—into the fold of the Chaldean Catholic Church

Some historians also describe Petros Elia as a man driven solely by his own ambitions. Military advisors from the Entente Powers reported that Petros was conspiring against Patriarch Shimun XXI and attempting to ruin his reputation in the eyes of the Entente. In their reports, Lieutenant Gasfield and French Surgeon-Major Caujole noted that he was not held in high regard even by his own subordinates

Reports from the Ottoman Ministry of the Interior’s General Directorate of Security state that Agha Petros raided Assyrian/Nestorian villages in the region—whether neutral or loyal to the Ottoman Empire—forcibly conscripting young men into a militia unit under the command of the Russian army and seizing the logistical resources of villages that resisted.

=== Malik Khoshaba ===
Malik Khoshaba led forces in counterattacks against the far larger Ottoman Army during and after the period known as the Assyrian Genocide with some success. Khoshaba was known for his bravery, cruelty and military capabilities during this time.

During the first summer of the arrival of the Assyrian refugees in Iran, the Assyrians of Lower Tyari under the leadership of Malik Khoshaba were settled around the mountains of Seray where they were besieged by Turkish and Kurdish forces under the command of Khalil Pasha. During the night, Malik Khiyo of Ashitha (17 years old at the time) observed two groups crossing his front, positioned himself in an artillery observation post and directed a moonlight strike to hold off the enemy. Two of Khoshaba's patrols were successful in capturing Turkish and Kurdish soldiers to gather intel about their positions. Khoshaba was also successful in preventing the enemy's field guns from damaging his post at dawn, while also bringing in twenty-four Turkish prisoners and personally killing four Turkish soldiers. By 7:30am, the enemy was beaten by the men of Khoshaba and Khiyo of Ashitha. On 13 August 1917, in Seray and Mavana, the Assyrians were surrounded by the 5th and 6th Divisions, under the leadership of Iskander Pasha, who vowed to annihilate the Assyrian race with their Persian allies. Khoshaba decided to withdraw his men to their defences for the night, and to send out patrols to halt the enemy moving towards Seray. By 10:30pm the Assyrians had captured eighty-eight prisoners and a mass of arms. Khoshaba, who could speak fluent Turkish, questioned the prisoners, most of whom claimed no reinforcements would be arriving. Khoshaba also translated a captured code of signals which would call for mortar bombs. Early the following morning, Khoshaba captured more Turkish prisoners; among them was a Turkish army colonel, second in command to Iskander Pasha.

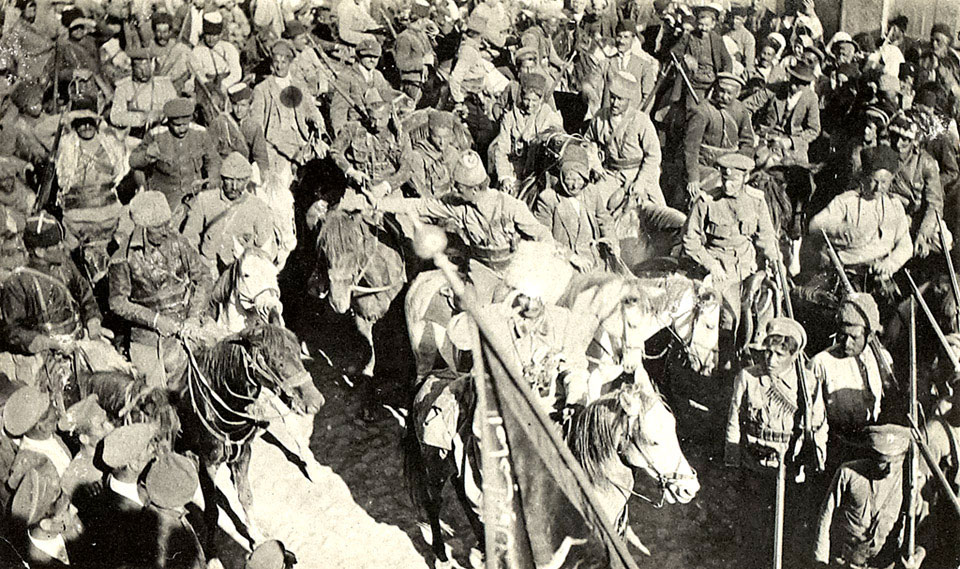
Assyrian troops led by Agha Petros (saluting) with a captured Turkish banner in the foreground, 1918

The Assyrian forces under the command of Malik Khoshaba and General Agha Petros numbered some 6,000 men, flanked by Allied (mainly Russian) troops. Their task at the time was to hold the front against the Turks who were attempting to advance on the city of Baku, in which they were successful in doing so for seven months (January - July 1918) while surrounded by enemy forces.

=== Assault on the Kurdish Fortress of Charah ===
Assyrians attacked the Fortress of Charah on March 16, 1918 after the murder of Mar Shimun. Simko Shikak, who was responsible for the murder of the Assyrian patriarch Mar Shimun was staying in the fortress. The fortress had never been conquered despite numerous attempts by the Iranian government. During the battle, Simko was panic stricken after seeing the Assyrians rip apart his forces. While the battle was going on, Simko managed to flee, abandoning his men. After one day of fighting, the Kurds were decisively defeated. According to sources, Charah was completely red from the dead Shikak fighters.

== After World War I ==
During the peace conferences in Paris in 1919, the Assyrian delegation asked for a state in Diyarbekir Vilayet and northern Mesopotamia in Iraq, others requested a British protectorate in Upper Mesopotamia, northern Mosul, and Urmia. This was however rejected by Great Britain and the U.S. delegates. The Assyrians tried to retake the region, but the Turks and Kurds objected to the Assyrians desire to retake their ancestral lands in Hakkari, and an attempt to occupy the region by Agha Petros failed. In 1924 Turkey formally occupied northern Hakkari and expelled the last Christian inhabitants who still remained in the region.

=== Death toll ===
The Assyrian delegation at the 1919 Paris Peace Conference and in 1923, at the Lausanne Conference estimated that between 250,000-275,000 Assyrians died during the Assyrian genocide around half the prewar population of 600,000

== See also ==
- Assyrian independence movement
