= Battle of Ushno =

1918 World War I battle

Battle of Ushno (1918)
- Part of Persian campaign (World War I)
Date	16 April 1918
Location	Oshnavieh, Sublime State of Iran
Result	Assyrian victory: The Ottoman force retreats from Ushno and Sauj Bulak

Belligerents
Assyrian volunteers	Ottoman Empire: 6th division; (Qajar Iran) Persian troops; (Kurdistan Region) Kurdish tribesmen

Commanders and leaders
Agha Petros	(Ottoman Empire) Kheiri Bey

Strength
Unknown	2,000 troops

Casualties and losses
Unknown	1,000 killed: 325–350 POW; 24 officers; 5 machine guns and 2 field guns seized

The Battle of Ushno (16 April 1918) was a military engagement near present-day Oshnavieh, in the West Azerbaijan province of Iran, fought between the Assyrian volunteers led by Agha Petros against the Ottoman force led by Kheiri Bey, reinforced by local Persian troops and Kurdish tribesmen.

== Background ==
In late March 1918, the Ottomans had in response to the British Invasion of western Iran, dispatched a force to Iranian Azerbaijan in order to occupy both Sauj Bulak (known today as Mahabad) and Ushno.

Persian Cossack troops were dispatched to Urmia and Dilman by the Iranian government in order to disarm the Assyrians. They failed, and the Assyrians continued to carry their arms and maintain their military organization.

== Battle ==
During the middle of April 1918, reports came that an Ottoman Turkish force numbering 2,000, accompanied by Persians, began advancing towards the Assyrian positions in the east from Ushno and Sauj Bulak. Consequently, Agha Petros placed himself in command of the Assyrians in order to advance against the force.

Entering through the mountains in Ushno, Petros found the Turks in force, attacked them and defeated them. Following their defeat on 16 April 1918, the Turks were forced to retire from Ushno and Sauj Bulak.

According to a near-contemporary account of the battle, Kheiri Bey, commander of the Sixth Ottoman Division, was defeated at Ushno, with nearly 1,000 Turkish soldiers reportedly killed and 300 captured, including 23 officers.

== Aftermath ==
The Assyrians returned to Urmia with 325-350 prisoners of war from the Turkish regular army, 24 of them being officers, besides a large number of Kurdish tribesmen. The prisoners were treated well, and were released within a few days.

== See also ==
- Agha Petros
- Battle of Suldouze
- Malik Khoshaba
- Barandouz River
