= Surchi Revolt =

1919-20 Kurdish revolt in British Mandatory Iraq

- Part of Iraqi Revolt
| Date | c. 1919–1920 |
| Location | Akre District, Mandatory Iraq |
| Result | Revolt suppressed |

Belligerents
| Surchi tribesmen: Zebari tribesmen; Barzani tribesmen; Sherwani tribesmen | United Kingdom; Iraq Levies |

Commanders and leaders
| Ba'bakr Beg; Faris Agha; Ahmed Barzani | Agha Petros; Malik Khoshaba; General Haldane |

Strength
| 5,000 | 4,000–6,000 |

Casualties and losses
| Heavy | Unknown |

The Surchi revolt (Kurdish: ڕاپەڕینی سورچی, romanized: řapeřînî sûrçî) was a revolt held by the Surchi tribe in c. 1919 to 1920, the main goal of the revolt was to establish an independent Kurdish state.

== Background ==
In 1919, the Surchi Kurds of the Akre District launched a rebellion in opposition against the British government. The rebellion was difficult, the government failed to suppress the rebellion for a long time. Then the Kurds of the Surchi Tribe, launched an attack on the marching Assyrians who had a goal of occupying northern Iraq

Testimony

The Kurdish tribes east and north- east of Mosul caused us anxiety, but they, too, had learnt their lesson during 1919, and only the Surchi of the Aqra district rose in rebellion.

== Aftermath ==
After many sacks and sieges led by the Surchis on the Assyrians troops, they eventually got defeated by Assyrian forces of Agha Petros in the Defense of Jujar.

== See also ==
- Timeline of Kurdish uprisings
- Kurdish tribes
- Defense of Jujar
- Battle of Aqra Dagh (1920)
