= Defense of Jujar =

- Part of Surchi Revolt
Date	15 September, 1920
Location	Mindan, Zab River, Iraq
Result	Assyrian victory

Belligerents
Kurdish tribesmen: Surchi tribesmen	Iraq Levies

Commanders and leaders
Babakr Agha	Agha Petros; Malik Khoshaba

Strength
600	Smaller than the Kurds

Casualties and losses
60 killed	4 killed, 8 wounded

The Defense of Jujar (15 September 1920) was a Kurdish attack on an Assyrian repatriation camp named Jujar located in Mindan, Iraq. Although the Kurdish force outnumbered the Assyrians, the assault failed, and they were decisively defeated and driven back across the Zab River by the Assyrian defenders.

== Background ==
In circa 1919, the Surchi Kurds of the Akre district launched a rebellion in opposition against the British government. The rebellion was a strong one, and the government failed to put it down for a long time. it wasn’t until September of 1920, when the Surchi Kurds attacked the Assyrian camp of Jujar, that they were defeated by the Assyrian forces of Agha Petros.

== Battle ==
During the second week of September 1920, the Surchi Kurds launched an attack on the Assyrian repatriation camp of Jujar, located thirty miles northeast of Mosul. Despite being heavily outnumbered, the Assyrians—who were better armed and disciplined—inflicted heavy losses on the attackers—reportedly killing 60 and forcing others to flee across the Zab River. The Assyrians sustained only minimal casualties (4 killed, 8 wounded).
