= Armenian battalions =

Armenian battalions refer to military units formed by Armenian volunteer conscripts, mostly fighting against the Ottoman forces:

- 1912-13, Balkan Wars, an auxiliary battle group in Bulgarian Army. It was led by Andranik Ozanian, who was the commander of Armenian auxiliary troops in the Macedonian-Adrianopolitan Volunteer Corps within the Bulgarian army. (Andranik Ozanian#Balkan Wars)
- 1914-17, World War I, Armenian volunteer units were employed in the Russian Imperial Army. Antranik also in fought in the First World War fought as commander of the First Armenian Volunteer Battalion 7 within the Russian Caucasus Army.
- 1914-17, World War I, Armenian volunteer units were employed in the Egyptian Expeditionary Force of British Army.
- 1916-20, World War I, French Armenian Legion were employed in the French Army. The unit was active in Adana and Arara.
- 1940-45, World War II, Armenian Legion.
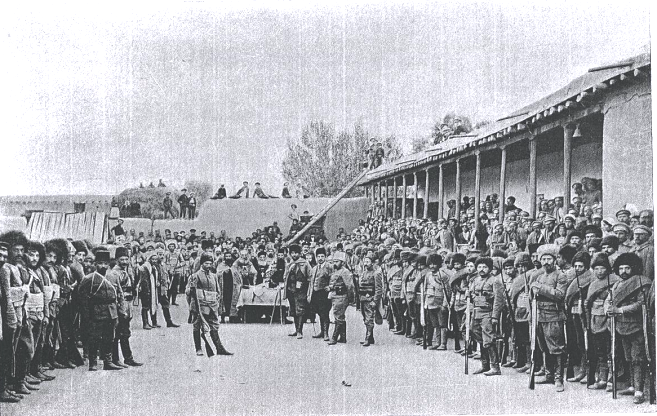
Armenian volunteer units detachment under Russian Caucasus Army

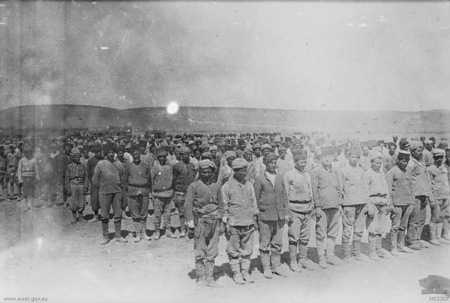
Armenian battalion one of the detachments under Dunsterforce

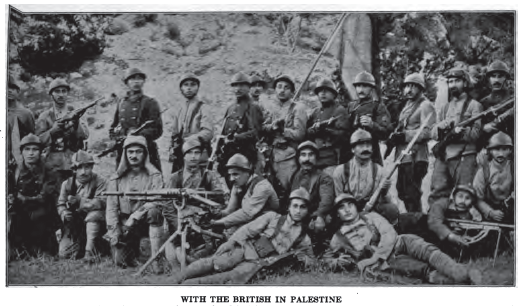
Armenian volunteers under Egyptian Expeditionary Force

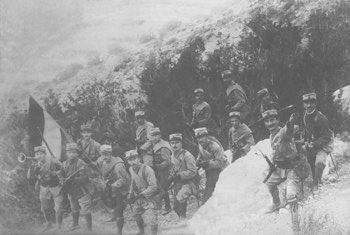
French Armenian Legion within French Army
