= Urmia clashes =

Conflict in World War I Iranian campaign

- Part of Persian campaign (World War I)
- Agha Petros waiting for the Persian Mullah's white flag's of surrender.
| Date | February 1918 |
| Location | Urmia, Persia |
| Result | Assyrian victory: Assyrian control of the city established; Muslims surrender |

Belligerents
| Assyrian volunteers; Tyari; Armenian fedayi | Qajar Iran; Tribes of Karadagh; Local Iranians; Local Azerbaijanis; Local Kurds; Local Turks |

Commanders and leaders
| Agha Petros; Mar Benyamin Shimun; Malik Khoshaba (First Republic of Armenia) Andranik Ozanian | Arshad-el-Moolk (surrendered); Moosa Agha Sadir; Irshad Homayun; Haji Samad; Riza Khan † |

Strength
| A few hundred | Around 2,000+ |

Casualties and losses
| Around 80 killed | 1,000+ killed |

The Urmia clashes (February 1918) were a series of armed confrontations during February 1918 in the city of Urmia, that took place between the local Muslims and Christian militias composed of Assyrians and Armenians, led by Agha Petros and Malik Khoshaba. An armed uprising was orchestrated by the Persian district governor together with Muslim clerics and former constitutionalist revolutionaries from Urmia, who conspired to "wipe out" the Christians. On 22 February 1918, Persian Cossack forces entered the town, triggering several days of street fighting between the Muslims and Christians.

== Background ==
On January 11, the first battle between the Assyrians and the Iranian Government occurred when 55 Assyrian soldiers out of the 100 stationed in Salamas, left for Julfa to get clothing for the army when they were ambushed and killed by the Iranian army. Soon after, the Iranians attacked the Assyrians stationed in Khoy but were pushed back, and the Assyrians would only retain 42 out of the original 100 after these clashes. This incident was quickly delivered to the Patriarch Mar Benyamin Shimun, who after seeing an Iranian cavalry leave Tabriz and go towards Urmia, sent delegates including Agha Petros to the mayor of Urmia, Irshad Homayun, who said that the killings wouldn't stop which left the Assyrian delegates saddened. After hearing the news, Mar Benyamin arranged a meeting with the Central council of Assyrians and Armenians, and there they came to the agreement to fight if the Iranians were to attempt to expel them.

On February 9, some Assyrians were entering the city through the western gate when they were shot upon and killed by the soldiers of Arshad el Moolk. Soon after, a special force was sent by Arshad el Moolk to surround Agha Petros in his home which was located in the Christian quarter of Urmia. Agha Petros told his family to hide and proceeded to shoot a machine gun he had planted in a position within the building at them, while the walls and windows of his mansion were being riddled by their bullets. He thinned down so rapidly and so effectively the line of the attackers, that they left the heaps of their dead and wounded and fled leaving their dead.

== Battle ==
Soon after an Assyrian force of 600 where sent to occupy the city's House of Customs, soon after Agha Petros rode to a village called Hyperabat to bring weapons and cannons with Russian trainers left there and soon after arrived in Urmia. There they waited to see if the Iranians would attack first as the Assyrians didn't want to start hostilities, soon after the Iranian Army attacked a weapons depot while the Assyrian army was eating which forced the Assyrians to counterattack the Iranians.

The Assyrians entrenched themselves and began to engage. The Assyrians where ordered to hold there position no matter what. Soon after 150 fighters were sent to the weapons depot to free it in which they used grenades and bayonets they released the weapons depot and killed many from the Iranians.

Iranian advances into Assyrian held parts of the city where stopped by Agha Petros, Soon after Patriarch Mar Benyamin and General Agha Petros where contemplating what they would do the next day but shortly after both Arshad el Moolk General the Iranian army and Irshad Homayun led another attempt to defeat the Assyrians but that also was put down by the Assyrians who remained in the same positions they had the entire day. On the first day of the battle the entire western part of the city had fallen into the hands of the Assyrians. During the night, additional troops were stationed in the city and at one of the western gates, it was decided to occupy by smaller units some other positions in the southern part of the city as the gate also was near an American mission. At the southern gate was stationed Malik Khoshaba with some two hundred of his own Tyari fighters. Their position faced directly the ancient parts of the city which the following morning would be held by very large forces of the Iranian troops. In the rear of the Tyari fighters and about half a mile away outside the city wall was another fort taken by Karadagh horsemen.

Early in the morning of Saturday February 10, the hostilities opened similarly in the city and out of the city. Some Assyrian troops were bringing ammunition to their comrades who were being attacked within the walls of Urmia when they were intercepted by the horsemen of Karadagh who emerged from the fort and attempted to capture the ammunition and also the cannon, which they were bringing up at the call of Agha Petros. The Karadagh fighters under their Persian officers where defeated, and fled back into the shelter of the fort. The Assyrians planted their guns against the stronghold and then took it by assault. The famous horsemen where defeated and among their dead was the body of Riza Khan, a Persian General. Meanwhile, the men of Malik Khoshaba who were at the southern gate and directly opposite the ancient defensive parts within the walls repelled back the troops of Arshad el Moolk. They surrounded the defensive parts and took that stronghold. The Assyrian troops positioned on the main street leading to the western gate known as the gate of Charbash had advanced further east into the city, and had pushed back the troops of Arshad el Moolk. The Muslim residents of Urmia vacated the streets and began a guerrilla warfare from the roofs and the windows of their houses. Extremely worried about the lives of his men, Agha Petros issued orders to the troops to stop their advance.

Soon after the Persians surrendered and the Urmia Muslims began to wave white flags of surrender, Arshad el Moolk surrendered while the mayor Irshad Homayun ran to the French Monsignor Sontag who Irshad would eventually murder along with Mar Toma Audo.

In this battle, the Iranians lost more than a thousand people and the Assyrians lost no less than eighty people.

The Tyari fighters where given major credit for their effort in the battle.

== Aftermath ==
The city was still being guarded by the Assyrian troops when the Patriarch with his own advisers and Generals sent also after the representatives of the allied powers to hear the conditions he had prepared for the Urmia Muslims acceptance of surrender and also to have them present when the Muslim Mullah's signed those conditions.

The Muslims accepted the conditions presented to them and placed their signatures and swore their pledges.

== See also ==
- Battle of Charah
- Battle of Suldouze
- Persian Campaign
- Sayfo
- Assyrian Rebellion
- Assyrian Volunteers
- Assyrian Levies
- Mar Benyamin Shimun
- Agha Petros
- Malik Khoshaba

== Sources ==
- Ismael, Yaqou D'Malik (1964). Assyrians and Two World Wars: Assyrians from 1914 to 1945. Tehran: The Literary Society of Assyrian Youth.

Attribution:
