= Malik Khoshaba =

Assyrian leader (1877–1954)

Malik Khoshaba d'Malik Yousif ܡܠܟ ܚܕܒܫܒܐ ܝܘܣܦ
- ܡܠܟ ܚܕܒܫܒܐ ܝܘܣܦ
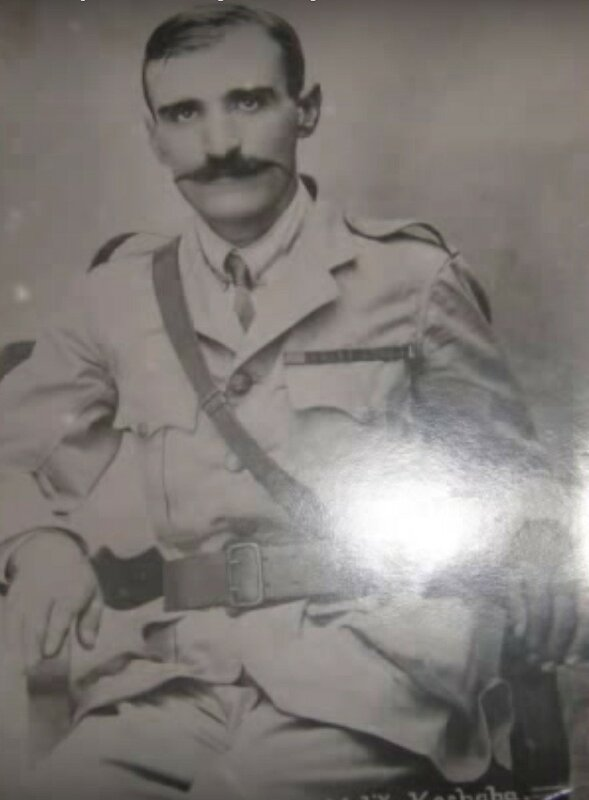
- Born: 1877; Tyari, Hakkari, Ottoman Empire
- Died: 1954 (aged 76–77); Mosul, Iraq
- Military career
- Allegiance: Tyari tribe Allies of World War I
- Nickname: Lion of Tyari
- Commands: Lower Tyari tribe Assyrian volunteers, later the Assyrian levies
- Conflicts: Assyrian-Kurdish Clashes (1900-1910); World War I; Persian campaign; Hakkari Expedition 1916; Hakkari Expedition 1917; Battle of Seray Mountain; Urmia Clashes; Battle of Charah; Battle of Suldouze; Battle of Urmia April 1918; Battle of Urmia June 1918; Assyrian rebellion; Surchi Revolt; Defense of Jujar; Battle of Aqra Dagh (1920)

Malik Khoshaba Yousif Zaia (Syriac: ܡܠܟ ܚܕܒܫܒܐ ܝܘܣܦ) was an Assyrian tribal leader (or "malik") of the Tyari tribe (Bit Tyareh) who played a significant role in the Assyrian independence movement during World War I.

== Early life ==
Malik Khoshaba was born in the village of Lizan in the Lower Tyari region of which lies in modern-day Turkey. Khoshaba descended from the distinguished "Bet Polous" family of ancient lineage. He completed his primary education at a Presbyterian missionary in Tyari before continuing his secondary studies in Mosul and completing his further studies at the American college in Urmia. Khoshaba was well versed in several languages such as English, Arabic, Kurdish and Russian that made him a standout individual within the Tyari Assyrians who inhabited the region of Hakkari in southeastern Anatolia. While in Urmia his studies were interrupted by a tragic event that tested his mettle as a leader in Lower Tyari: while away at Urmia, Malik Khoshaba’s father, Malik Yousif, was murdered by the Kurdish Rashid Beg, the “Mira” or prince, of the Barwari region in 1900. This tragedy required his return to Lower Tyari where he vowed to avenge his father’s murder. In 1908, Malik Khoshaba assembled a formidable force of Lower Tyari fighters from the villages of Lizan, Bne Laggipa, Minyanish, Zawitha and Zarne and attacked the Barwari Kurds where a fierce battle ensued that resulted in Malik Khoshaba killing Rashid Beg’s brother, Said Beg, thereby avenging his father’s murder.

Khoshaba's grandfather, Malik Patto of Lower Tyari, fought against Bedr Khan Beg of Bohtan during the 1843 and 1846 massacres in Hakkari in 1843. Patto's family ruled over Tyari for 600 years and was successful in bringing back Patriarch Mar Abraham Shimun to Hakkari after the attacks of Bedir Khan Beg.

== World War I ==
Khoshaba led forces in counterattacks against the far larger Ottoman Army during and after the period known as the Assyrian genocide with some success. Khoshaba was known for his bravery, cruelty and military capabilities during this time.

In one engagement, seeing a large convoy of girls and young women whom the Turks were carrying off, Malik Khoshaba led a small force to attack the convoy. Dividing his force into two, he attacked the Turks from both sides. In this encounter he completely vanquished the Turks, and delivered from their grip 2,600 women and girls, whom they led back to the neighbourhood of Bashkale and Deir, where the 47,000 refugees were encamped. During this fight, Malik Khoshaba lost only six men.

The Assyrian forces under the command of Malik Khoshaba and General Agha Petros numbered some 6,000 men, flanked by Allied (mainly Russian) troops. Their task at the time was to hold the front against the Turks who were attempting to advance on the city of Baku, in which they were successful in doing so for seven months (January - July 1918) while surrounded by enemy forces.

During the first summer of the arrival of the Assyrian refugees in Iran, the Assyrians of Lower Tyari under the leadership of Malik Khoshaba were settled around the mountains of Seray where they were besieged by Turkish and Kurdish forces under the command of Khalil Pasha. During the night, Malik Khiyo of Ashitha (17 years old at the time) observed two groups crossing his front, positioned himself in an artillery observation post and directed a moonlight strike to hold off the enemy. Two of Khoshaba's patrols were successful in capturing Turkish and Kurdish soldiers to gather intel about their positions. Khoshaba was also successful in preventing the enemy's field guns from damaging his post at dawn, while also bringing in twenty-four Turkish prisoners and personally killing four Turkish soldiers. By 7:30am, the enemy was beaten by the men of Khoshaba and Khiyo of Ashitha. On 13 August 1917, in Seray and Mavana, the Assyrians were surrounded by the 5th and 6th Divisions, under the leadership of Iskander Pasha, who vowed to annihilate the Assyrian race with their Persian allies. Khoshaba decided to withdraw his men to their defences for the night, and to send out patrols to halt the enemy moving towards Seray. By 10:30pm the Assyrians had captured eighty-eight prisoners and a mass of arms. Khoshaba, who could speak fluent Turkish, questioned the prisoners, most of whom claimed no reinforcements would be arriving. Khoshaba also translated a captured code of signals which would call for mortar bombs. Early the following morning, Khoshaba captured more Turkish prisoners; among them was a Turkish army colonel, second in command to Iskander Pasha.

He along with his fighters pacified Urmia of hostile Muslims bent on massacring Christians.

The Assyrian forces under the command of Malik Khoshaba and General Agha Petros numbered some 6,000 men, flanked by Allied (mainly Russian) troops. Their task at the time was to hold the front against the Turks who were attempting to advance on the city of Baku, in which they were successful in doing so for seven months (January - July 1918) while surrounded by enemy forces.

=== Battle of Charah ===
Assyrians attacked the Fortress of Charah on March 16, 1918 after the murder of Mar Shimun by the Iranian Kurdish leader Simko, Agha Petros joined forces with Malik Khoshaba and others in driving Simko from his stronghold at Koynashahr. Simko Shikak, who was responsible for the murder of the Assyrian patriarch Mar Shimun was staying in the fortress. The fortress had never been conquered despite numerous attempts by the Iranian government. During the battle, Simko was panic stricken after seeing the Assyrians rip apart his forces. While the battle was going on, Simko managed to flee, abandoning his men. After one day of fighting, the Kurds were decisively defeated. It is said that the river in Charah was completely red from the dead Shikak fighters.

== Later life ==
Malik Khoshaba was appointed the president of the Assyrian Advisory Committee which was made up of a number of influential Assyrian tribal leaders. This led to two factions developing within the Assyrians of Iraq, a patriarchal faction led by Shimun XXI Eshai and a non-patriarchal faction led by Malik Khoshaba and Mar Zaya Sargis, Bishop of Jilu. The tension between the two factions reached a pinnacle according to a letter from the Administrative Inspector of Mosul to the Ministry of Interior, on 19 June 1933, Khoshaba, accompanied with Malik Khiyo of Ashitha and Malik Zaia Shams-al-Din of Lower Tyari left from Nohadra to Amadiya against the wishes of the Qaimmaqam who warned Khoshaba that Malik Yaqo was awaiting him on the road with at least 80 armed men. This resulted in the Mustarrif sending Iraqi police to ensure Khoshaba and his accompanions were not harmed and further drove the split between the factions.

== Controversy ==
Later in life, Khoshaba became a figure of great controversy among Assyrians. He was seen by many (though not all) as a divisive figure, particularly with regards to undermining the cause of Assyrian autonomy within the newly created and Arab-dominated state of Iraq in 1932.

According to British Army officer Ronald Sempill Stafford, Khoshaba murdered his own wife and daughter, believing that she had engaged in immoral conduct.

== See also ==
- Assyrian people
- Simele massacre
- Assyrian genocide
