= Agha Petros =

Assyrian military leader (1880–1932)

Petros Elia of Baz ܦܸܛܪܘܿܣ ܐܹܠܝ݂ܵܐ ܕܒܵܙ
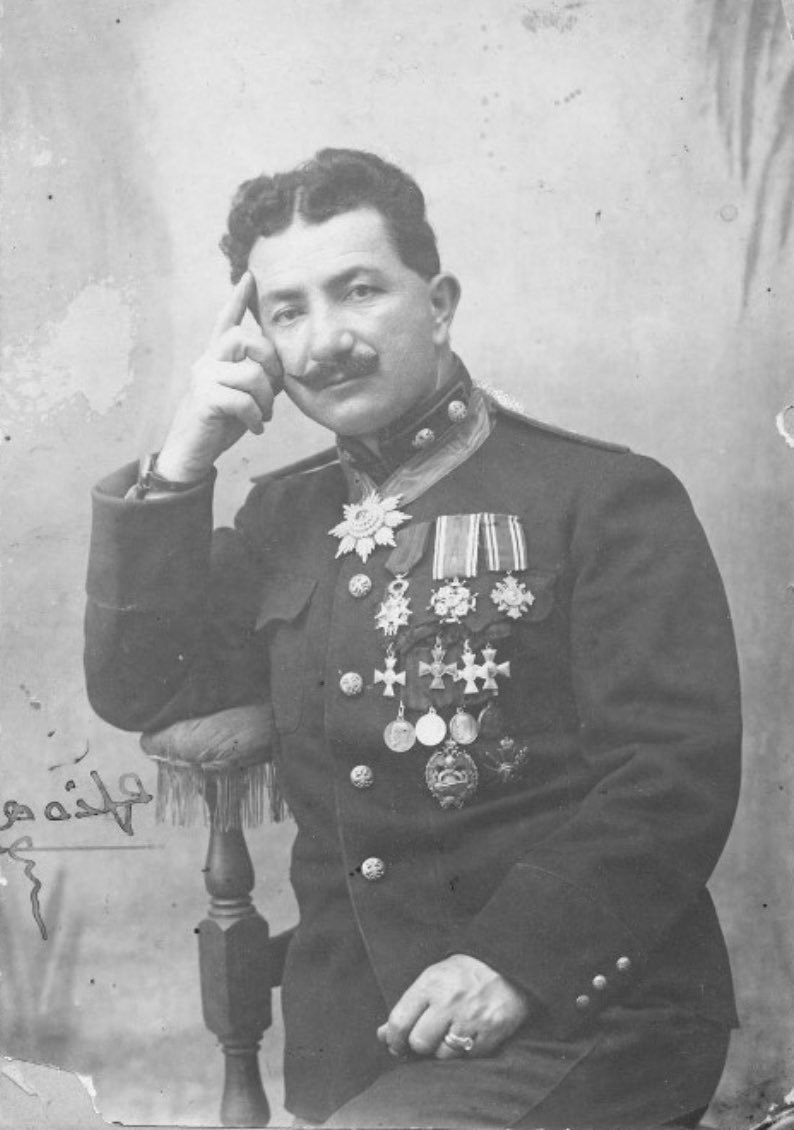
- Agha Petros in his French uniform, in the 1920s
- Born: Petros Elia; 1 April 1880; Baz, Hakkari, Ottoman Empire
- Died: 2 February 1932 (aged 51); Toulouse, France
- Spouse: Zarifa Khanum
- Military career
- Allegiance: Allies of World War I, Assyrian volunteers
- Service years: c.1914–1923
- Rank: General officer
- Nickname: Agha Petros
- Commands: Assyrian volunteers
- Conflicts: See list: World War I; Persian Campaign; Battle of Dilman; Battle of Tabriz; Hakkari Expedition 1916; Battle of Seray Mountain; Battle of Oramar; Urmia Clashes; Battle of Charah; Battle of Suldouze; Battle of Ushno; Mesopotamian campaign; Battle of Sharqat; Caucasus campaign; Battle of Bitlis; Defense of Van (1915); Surchi Revolt; Defense of Jujar; Battle of Aqra Dagh
- Awards: Croix de Guerre (France); Ordre national de la Légion d'honneur (France); Cross of St. George (Russia); Order of Saint Stanislaus (Russia); Royal Order of the Lion (Belgium); Order of the Crown, Commander, (Belgium); Order of San Gregorio, Commander, (Vatican Pope Benoit XV) 1921

Signature
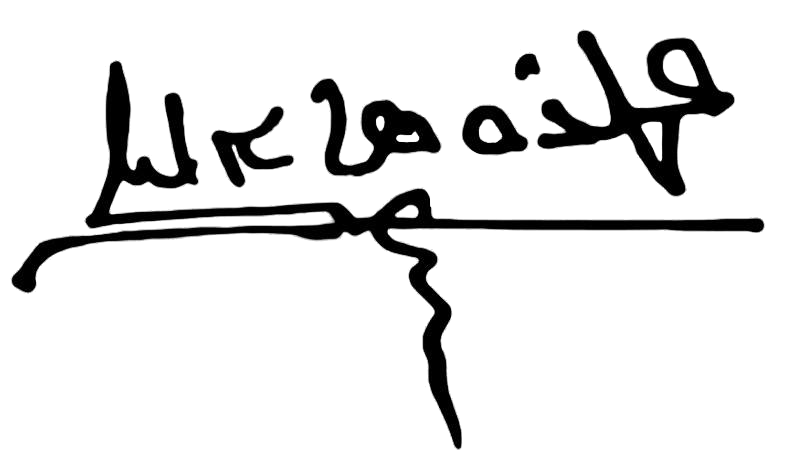

Petros Elia of Baz (Syriac: ܦܸܛܪܘܿܣ ܐܹܠܝ݂ܵܐ ܕܒܵܙ), commonly known as Agha Petros (Syriac: ܐܓܐ ܦܛܪܘܣ; 1 April 1880 – 2 February 1932), was an Assyrian military leader, warlord, and later diplomat, best known for his role during World War I. During the Assyrian genocide, he served as commander-in-chief of the Assyrian volunteer units and primarily defeated Ottoman forces and their Kurdish allies in several military engagements.

== Early years ==
Portait of a young Petros Elia

Petros Elia was born on 1 April 1880, in the village of Lower Baz to Elia, the son of Shlimon Al-Yaqira, a notable from the Dejamala clan of Baz. He was forced to leave his home village on account of a blood fued, which led him to attend an American Presbyterian missionary school in Urmia, Qajar Iran. During his early years, Petros was a "talented linguist" and teacher, fluent in eight languages. As he completed his education in Urmia, he toured several countries, including India, China, Japan, the United States and Canada.

During his stay in British Columbia (Canada), he resorted to collecting money purportedly for the building of an orphanage in Macedonia. He then fled the country as Canadian police was about to arrest him and was later to be found in Rome, where he passed himself off as an Assyrian tribal chief desirous to convert his tribe to Catholicism. Impressed and grateful for this decision, the Pope granted him an official Vatican decoration.

=== Consular position ===
Upon his return from Canada, Petros settled down and married Zarifa, the daughter of the Ottoman vice-consul (shahbender) of Urmia, in May 1906. Impressed by his decoration from the Pope, the Ottoman government appointed Petros to a consular position in Urmia around 1908-1909. (Note: Date varies, one source claims that Agha Petros was the vice-consul or "shahbender" of Urmia in 1908 until his replacement in 1909, whereas another source claims that he became consul of Urmia in 1909.) While several sources identify him as a consul at this time, others describe him as vice-consul (shahbender). One source claims that Tahir Pasha, Turkish delegate to the Frontier Commission, had appointed Petros to consul with a guard of 25 soldiers. Petros largely served the interest of his own people, protecting Assyrians from oppression at the hands of the local authorities or Kurdish tribes through the use of his consular authority, thus earning him a medal from the Pope.

Viktor Shklovsky, a Russian Commissar, recounted that Petros, while in service to the Turks, had "thoroughly pillaged the province" and later became a "big man in Persia". He was once summoned by the Persian governor of Urmia on account of a charge, and handled it by arresting him, forcing the Khans to recognize him as the new governor. The Shah himself therefore summoned Petros to come before him, but refusing, the Shah managed to persuade him to resign by sending a medal. According to one account, he had reportedly governed a certain locality and ruined the local populace through exorbitant taxation during his tenure at the consulate.

His position in the consulate had elicted Iranian protests, prompting Ottoman authorities to replace him by 1909. According to historian David Gaunt, this act of rejection drove Petros closer to the Russians. With the Russian arrival in Northwestern Persia in 1908, he would eventually forsake the Ottomans and shift his loyalty to the Russian Empire, subsequently serving as a translator at the Russian consulate in Urmia.

== World War I ==
When Russian forces entered Urmia, he commanded an Assyrian volunteer army that fought alongside the Allies of World War I. He also served alongside Russian forces in the Van and Bitlis regions in 1915–1916, reportedly earning a reputation for gallantry in several military engagements. Petros served as commander of the left wing of the Assyrian volunteer units, while Dawid Mar Shimun served as commander of the right.

The Assyrians from Urmia were armed by the Russians and paraded in the streets behind Agha Petros in order to assert their attachment to the Triple Entente. Petros himself, after the war, mentions in a statement that the Russian Vice-Consul Vedenski and Colonel Andreevski gave promises of independence in exchange for Assyrian participation in combat alongside the Russians.

In February 1915, Jevdet Bey, governor of Van Vilayet, ordered a massacre of the Assyrians in Haftevan. In March that same year, when the Ottomans had returned in the direction of Van, Pavel Vedenski and Agha Petros, who had returned from the Caucasus, traveled to the village to recover the scattered bodies. Petros described the massacre in a report, claiming that 712-720 Christian men in Salmas were killed three days prior to the arrival of the Russians.

Assyrian militants under the command of Agha Petros, described as the "Christian army of revenge", alongside Russian Cossacks led by Nikolai Baratov, initially captured the town of Rawandiz, which had a population of approximately 10,000. In 1916, they perpetrated a massacre that left only 20% of the Kurdish population alive. British diplomat and officer Edward Noel, who toured areas formerly under Russian occupation in 1919, reported that Petros was to a great extent directly responsible for excesses committed by Russian troops throughout the region, citing the events at Rawandiz as an example.

Professor Michael A. Reynolds notes that non-Muslim warlords such as Agha Petros did not require notions of Jihad to motivate their acts. He has been described by Kristian Girling as a controversial figure accused of permitting violent excesses by the soldiers under his command.

=== Russian revolution ===
Following the Russian revolution of 1917, the Russians retreated from the battlefront, leaving behind machine guns and ammunition, supplemented by 20,000 French lebel rifles that were dispersed to the troops of Agha Petros. Following the Russian withdrawal, he retreated to Urmia, where the Assyrian and Armenian communities elected him as leader and appointed him commander-in-chief of the Christian forces. He played a large role in the organization of Assyrian troops after the revolution, recruiting other Assyrians to fight alongside the Assyrians of Urmia, thus reinforcing their sense of unity. He also attended a meeting with representatives of the Entente Powers in Urmia, where they promised the Assyrians weapons, ammunition and money to establish Assyrian autonomy.

Despite the Russian withdrawal, Russian Cossacks and officers chose to remain in Urmia. The Assyrians and Armenians subsequently organized a joint army alongside the Russians. Three Assyrian battalions made up the largest group, comprising 4,000 soldiers. The high command in Urmia included Cossack lieutenant Kondratov, Petros, Mar Shimun, Dawid Mar Shimun and several tribal leaders.

Surrounded by enemy forces on all sides, Agha Petros and Malik Khoshaba were tasked to hold the frontlines against the Ottoman Turks, who wanted to advance on the city of Baku. Petros also commanded Armenian troops that fought alongside them, though the British officer R.S. Stafford claimed that "Agha Petros had no real control over Assyrians or Armenians", and that he was "indeed greatly mistrusted by many of them".

=== Clashes in Urmia ===
The Assyrians had the desire to establish an independent state in Urmia and Salmas, which the Azerbaijanis, Kurds and Iranian government were opposed to. The Persian district governor, together with Muslim clerics and former constitutionalist revolutionaries from Urmia, conspired to get rid of the Assyrians and Armenians, planning for an armed uprising.

On 22 February 1918, the Muslims attacked the Christian part of Urmia, including the house of Agha Petros, who, together with Malik Khoshaba, succeeded in taking control of a large portion of the city before the Muslims eventually raised a white flag, signalling their surrender. Over 600 Muslims were killed during the conflict, and a group of mullahs went to the Patriarch Mar Shimun and officially surrendered, while the governor, Ijlal-ul-Mulk, sent a letter of capitulation.

Following their victory, the Assyrians and Armenians proposed establishing a new council composed of an equal number of Christian and Muslim representatives. The Assyrian and Armenian leaders attempted to peacefully work out a temporary government for Urmia.

=== Assassination of Mar Shimun ===
Agha Petros was unfriendly to Mar Shimun and disliked his temporal power. It was also reported that he tried to scheme against Mar Shimun by trying to dissuade the Allies from trusting him. On 3 March 1918, Mar Shimun, whose supremacy was now under threat from Petros, accepted an invitation from the Kurdish tribal leader Simko Shikak to attend a meeting in Kuhnashahir, where they would discuss the establishment of a Kurdish-Assyrian alliance. He was warned of the risk in attending the meeting, but disregarded it. Petros attempted to persuade Mar Shimun into abandoning the idea of attending the meeting, telling him: "The cross is yours and the sword is ours, please renounce the meeting". Mar Shimun was, however, along with his 150 bodyguards, assassinated by Simko during the meeting.

The assassination ignited a civil war between the Assyrians and Kurds, which led armed Assyrians to carry out massacres against Azerbaijani Turks, Kurds and Jews in the districts of Urmia and Salmas. The Assyrians also killed 500 Kurdish refugees in an Anti-Kurdish pogrom in the city of Urmia.

=== Battle of Charah ===
Following Mar Shimun's death, Agha Petros gradually assumed some of the patriarchal authority and was now in charge of the military leadership. In response to the assassination, he mobilized an army comprising two columns in pursuit of Simko Shikak. On 16 March 1918, the Assyrian force led by Petros and the Russian officer Count Cozmin, accompanied by Dawid Mar Shimun and Malik Khoshaba, launched an attack on the fortress of Charah where Simko was residing. After 36 hours of fighting, Simko was defeated and many of his people were killed. Simko escaped to Khoy with approximately 500 followers, after which the fortress was sacked and looted. The Assyrians attributed the principal credit for their victory to Petros, who had placed himself in charge of the fighters and sidelined the patriarchs relatives.

The missionary Frederick G. Coan claimed that despite of the excesses committed by the Christians against the Muslims during this period of instability, both Agha Petros and Malik Khoshaba deserved credit for protecting Muslim property, posting guards at their gates, and doing everything possible to maintain law and order. They also cooperated with American missionaries in arranging the burial of bodies lying in the streets and transporting the wounded to the hospital.

=== Resistance in Urmia and exodus ===
Agha Petros managed to unite and command three factions in 1918, comprising contigents drawn from the local Assyrian population of Urmia (numbering approximately 25,000), Assyrian refugees from Hakkari (35,000) and Armenians from the Lake Van region (20,000).

By April 1918, the Armenian military leader Andranik, with a force of nearly 5,000 men, was hoping to unite with the Assyrians in Urmia─where Agha Petros was in full command─in order to present a front to the enemy. As Andranik started to fight his way south, the Turks were able to prevent his advance. William A. Wigram stated that: "though both [Andranik and Petros] were excellent fighters and good guerilla leaders, were neither of them real generals in a military sense..."

During April 1918, the Ottoman Turks advanced towards the Assyrian positions in the east from Ushno and Sauj Bulak (present-day Mahabad). Petros placed himself in command of an Assyrian force in order to confront the Turks. Entering through the mountains in Ushno, he found the Turks in force, attacked them and defeated them. Following their defeat on 16 April 1918, the Turks were forced to retreat from Ushno and Sauj Bulak.

For the next three months, the Assyrians under Agha Petros inflicted a series of defeats on a confederacy of Ottoman Turks, Kurds and Persians, south and north of Urmia. A force of 12,000 Turks under Ali Ihsan Pasha attacked the Assyrians from the north, while another of 8,000 under Kheiri Bey attacked from the east. Petros, who was in charge of a cavalry of 1,500 men, subsequently engaged and defeated Kheiri Bey in Suldouze (present-day Naqadeh).

According to Stanley G. Savige who joined the Dunsterforce in 1918, the standard bearer of the Assyrian army carried a large red flag with a white cross in the centre, being the flag of Agha Petros. It was made out of silk and fringed with gold, while the words "Trust God and Follow the cross" were written above the cross in Syriac (Assyrian).

Petros, described by Martin H. Donohoe as generalissimo, engaged with a force of Turkish regulars belonging to the 6th division around the Barandouz river on 17 May 1918, capturing their guns and supplies. This victory prevented a combined Turkish attack on Urmia from the south and north. The Turks however, stationed in Khoy, continued to pose a threat for the Christians in Urmia.

The Assyrians in Urmia were now threatened by two Ottoman divisions: the 5th Division, stationed to the north, and the 6th Division, stationed to the south, in addition to a large number of Kurdish and Persian irregular forces. On 8 July 1918, Captain Pennington of the Royal Air Force informed Agha Petros in Urmia that the British were prepared to supply the Assyrians with guns and ammunition, as their stocks were running low. It was consequently arranged that Petros would meet the British cavalry of the 14th Hussars in Sain Qaleh. Leading a force of 1,000-2,000 Assyrian and Armenian fighters, he departed towards the British position, leaving the Salmas Division to guard the northern front. Along the way, his force engaged Ottoman troops of the 6th Division and Kurdish forces at Sauj Bulak, defeating them and driving them back towards Rawandiz. The fighting delayed the force's arrival at Sain Qaleh by seven days. By the time Petros and his men arrived, however, the British had already withdrawn to Bijar.

In early June 1918, an Ottoman army commanded by Ali Ihsan Pasha launched an offensive to the north, in the city of Salmas, which they besieged and bombarded on 15 June. As the Ottoman troops took control of the city by 21 June, thousands of Christian survivors fled to Urmia. The Salmas Division, being mountaineers, refused to fight until the end for the Urmia Assyrians, believing that Petros had abandoned them and "gone off to safety".

== Later years ==
Petros was the head negotiator for the Assyrians between 1919 and 1923. On July 24, 1923, he took part in the League of Nations Peace Conference in Lausanne, Switzerland, where he approached the Turkish delegation for the resettlement of the Assyrians in and around Hakkâri Province in exchange for the loyalty of the Assyrians. The then secretary/minister of foreign affairs of Turkey, İsmet İnönü who was heading the Turkish delegation at Lausanne was in favor of the resettlement but a telegram received from the central government in Ankara prevented that.

During his last years Petros moved near Toulouse, France, where he lived until his death of a cerebral attack at the railway station, on February 2, 1932. In France, Agha Petros was dubbed the ''Young Napoleon,'' and in journals and newspapers, he was referred to as the ''New Nebuchadnezzar''.

== Controversies ==
Some historians believe Petros Elia was merely concerned by his own ambition.

== See also ==
- Assyrian people
- Assyrian genocide
- Assyrian nationalism
