= List of Assyrian tribes =

The following is a list of Assyrian tribes.

== Tribes ==
Prior to the First World War, Assyrians in the historical region of Hakkari were organised into ashiret (independent) and rayat (dependent) areas, which were usually called tribes.

- Albaq (Elbek)
- Āshīṯā (Note: The village of Āshīṯā was a rayat of the Tyari.)
- Barwar
- Baz
- Bohtan
- Deyree
- Diz (Note: Diz was part of the ashiret area, but was not always considered to be tribal. Also spelt as Dez.)
- Doskee
- Gawar
- Gawar Pinyānish
- Halamon
- Ishtazin (Lesser Jilu) (Note: Gaunt names Ishtazin as an ashiret tribe whilst Wilmshurst considers them to have been a rayat tribe.)
- Jilu
- Kharawatta
- Leyone
- Liwan
- Mahmoodieh
- Mar Bishu (Note: The village of Mar Bishu was included in the rayat area Shamsdin. Also spelt as Marbishu.)
- Nochiya
- Norduz
- Oromaree
- Pinyānish
- Quchanis (Note: The village of Quchanis was part of the ashiret area, but was not always considered to be tribal.)
- Sara
- Shamizdin
- Ṭāl (Note: Ṭāl was part of the ashiret area, but was not always considered to be tribal. Wilmshurst names Ṭāl as a rayat tribe.)
- Timar d’Van
- Tkhuma
- Tyari
- Walto (Note: Walto was part of the ashiret area, but was not always considered to be tribal.)

== Bibliography ==
- Coakley, James F. (2011). "Hakkari". Gorgias Encyclopedic Dictionary of the Syriac Heritage. Piscataway, NJ: Gorgias Press. pp. 186–187.
- Donabed, Sargon George (2015). Reforging a Forgotten History: Iraq and the Assyrians in the Twentieth Century. Edinburgh University Press.
- Gaunt, David (2006). Massacres, Resistance, Protectors: Muslim-Christian Relations in Eastern Anatolia during World War I. Gorgias Press.
- Wilmshurst, David (2000). The Ecclesiastical Organisation of the Church of the East, 1318–1913 (PDF). Peeters Publishers.
- Yacoub, Joseph (2016). Year of the Sword: The Assyrian Christian Genocide, A History. Translated by James Ferguson. Oxford University Press.
