= Akre District =

Akre District قەزای ئاکرێ قضاء عقرة
- District
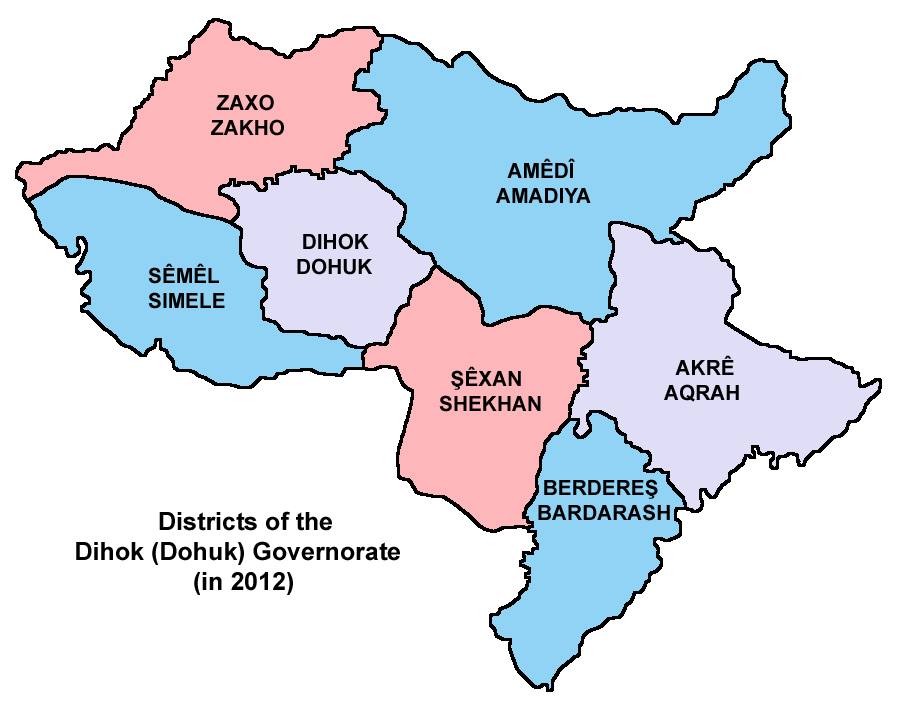
- Districts of Duhok Governorate
- Interactive map of Akre District
- Location of Akre in Iraq
- Coordinates (Akre): 36°44′29″N 43°53′36″E
- Country: Iraq
- Governorate: Nineveh Governorate (de jure) Duhok Governorate (de facto)
- Seat: Akre
- Time zone: UTC+3 (AST)
- Area code: +964 62

Akre District (Kurdish: قەزای ئاکرێ, romanized: Qezay Akrê, Arabic: قضاء عقرة) is a district in northern Iraq, disputed between the Iraqi Federal Government and the Kurdistan Regional Government. The administrative center is the city of Akre.
