= Battle of Suldouze =

1918 WWI battle in Persia

- Part of Persian campaign (World War I)
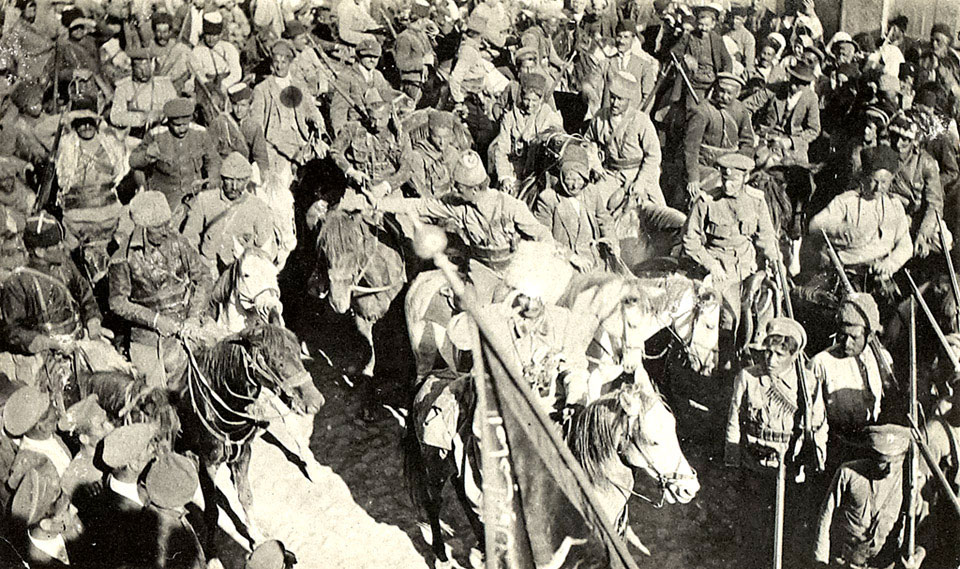
- Agha Petros, wearing his distinct white hat, can be seen saluting his soldiers as he rides by a captured Turkish banner.
Date	8–13 April 1918
Location	Suldouze, Qajar Iran
Result	Assyrian victory

Belligerents
Assyrian volunteers	Ottoman Empire

Commanders and leaders
Agha Petros; Malik Khoshaba	(Ottoman Empire) Kheiri Bey

Strength
1,500 Horsemen	8,000+

Casualties and losses
Unknown	Unknown

The Battle of Suldouze (8–13 April 1918) was a military engagement between the Assyrian Volunteers led by Agha Petros and Ottoman soldiers led by Kheiri Bey, who were stationed in the city of Suldouze.

== Background ==
Over the summer of 1915 the Assyrians successfully held off the far bigger Ottoman army, Kurdish militia and tribal forces fighting with the Ottomans. The Ottomans, unable to break the Assyrians, then brought in heavy artillery and ammunition that, together with an overwhelming advantage in numbers and supplies, eventually overwhelmed the lightly armed and outnumbered Assyrians. The Russian Army Corps had promised reinforcements, which came too late. Assyrians defended themselves against tremendous odds and conducted an orderly retreat. Survivors of fighting age joined the Assyrians of northwest Persia, northern Iraq and northeast Syria, including those from Salamas and Urmia to form an Assyrian army, and had a real prospect of fighting with the Russians to evict the Ottoman forces from Persia, and historic Assyria.

== Battle ==
After carefully mapping out his route and drafting his plans Agha Petros made the decision that he would move south in three columns, each separated by some miles. On colliding with the Turkish force his troops were swung into line, each column getting closer with each other. It was then decided to take up the best position available, and delay the battle to allow a strong mounted force to sweep down through the hills to a town called Suldouze, the headquarters of the Turks. It was then decided to attack during the night, and force the enemy to retreat to their base, and into the hands of the mounted force. The whole plan worked without a hitch. The column moving without trouble, got into touch with the Turks and formed a line, and in the dead of night, the whole line moved forward to the sounds of intense rifle fire and shouts of triumph. The Turks were baffled at this unexpected attack at such an unexpected time. Their stand was weak and they were forced to retire in a messy state to Suldouze, to find waiting for them a mounted force in such positions that the Turks were completely destroyed.

== Aftermath ==
Without any loss of time Agha Petros rode with his victorious troops to effect a junction where a British party was and were given enough money to buy food on their march back to Urmia.

In order to impress the Governor and inhabitants of Sain Kala, Agha Petros asked if the British Cavalry could ride in front of his forces through that particular town, knowing that the news of the British and Christians fighting together would be soon spread throughout the country. Fortunately for the whole show, as after events will prove, this was agreed to.

== See also ==
- Urmia Clashes
- Battle of Charah
- Persian Campaign
- Sayfo
- Assyrian Rebellion
- Assyrian Volunteers
- Assyrian Levies
- Mar Benyamin Shimun
- Mar Paulos Shimun
- Agha Petros
- Malik Khoshaba
- Surma Mar Shimun
