= Assyrian rebellion =

1920s rebellion in Turkey

Assyrian Rebellion
- Part of Revolts during the Turkish War of Independence and Assyrian independence movement
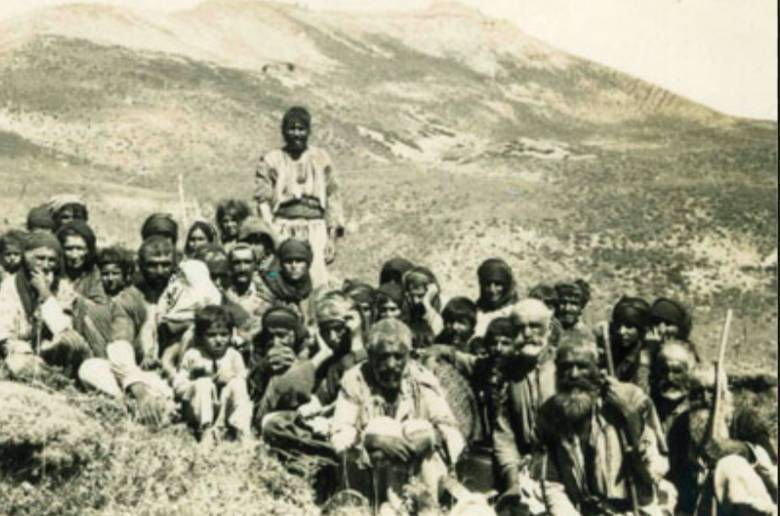
- Assyrian rebels in Hakkari
Date	July 1924 – 28 September 1924
Location	Hakkari
Result	Turkish victory: Successful Assyrian counter attack stopping a possible Turkish invasion of Iraq after gathering in Amadiya; Conflict ended when the British Royal Air Force bombed Turkey

Belligerents
Assyrians	Turkey: Kurdish tribes

Commanders and leaders
Malik Khoshaba; Malik Yaqo; Malik Yonan; Malik Shamisdin; Malik Ismail II; Malik Yousif	Mustafa Kemal Pasha; Süleyman Sabri Pasha; Osman Avni; Nurettin Pasha; Mürsel Pasha; Ferit Bey

Units involved
Tyari; Tkhuma	Turkish Armed Forces; Kurdish tribes

Strength
Less than 1,000 men	40,000+ men

Casualties and losses
Low	1,500+

The Assyrian rebellion (Turkish: Nasturi Ayaklanması, "Nestorian Uprising") was an uprising by the Assyrians in Hakkari. It began in July 1924 and ended on 28 September that same year. This was the first rebellion in the newly formed Republic of Turkey. After the rebellion ended, 8,000 Assyrians were deported into Mandatory Iraq.

(Another rebellion by the Assyrian community had taken place in 3–4 September 1924.)

== Background ==
Assyrians of Tyari and Tkhuma returned to their ancestral land in Hakkari in 1922, shortly after World War I, without permission from the Turkish government. In 1924, the Vali (Ottoman term for governor) of Van wrote to Auli Beg who was the Agha of the village of Chal, telling him to inform the Assyrians in Hakkari not to worry about their visit. The Vali wanted to discuss whether they had come to Hakkari under the force of the British or wanted to live in Turkey as citizens. The Vali stated that if Assyrians were coming to live as citizens peacefully, they would be free to do so. If they were coming by force of the British, then they would need to return to Iraq. However, the Kurdish Agha Auli Beg lied to the Assyrians and stated that the Turks were planning to expel them by force and annihilate them.

In July 1924, Assyrians met with the Vali of Van. Two guards stopped them before meeting him, but they could not understand each other as the Assyrians were speaking Aramaic and the Turks were speaking Turkish. Another Assyrian man arrived, and the Turks said there were now three Assyrians. One of the Turkish guards lowered his rifle, and the Assyrian who had just arrived quickly shot at the guards without aiming, and the guards did the same. Both of them missed. However, there were Assyrians who were hidden who began shooting at the Turks and ended up killing a governor and six Turkish soldiers. The Vali was wounded in this attack and were later taken and surrendered to the British in Amediya.

Malik Khoshaba expressed his disappointment in what had happened, claiming the Kurds tricked the Assyrians into attacking the Turks just like they did in 1915. The Assyrians in Hakkari were put in a difficult situation because the majority of Assyrian fighters were in military service with the British in Iraq. The British reassured the Assyrians that they would assist them with the British army and airplanes.

== Battle ==
A messenger was sent to Malik Ismael that told him that the Turkish army and their Kurdish allies were waiting to destroy them as they have occupied Julamerg and the district of Leon. A few Assyrian scouts went to the mountains of Istanbul and confirmed what the messenger had said and saw the large forces of Turks and Kurds.

In the early morning the fighting began and the Turks were bombarding the Assyrians with artillery and machine gun fire. The Assyrians were significantly outnumbered and outgunned and were using British single fire rifles. The Assyrians were waiting for help from the British Army or Navy, but it never arrived, and they struggled in battle using inferior weaponry. Assyrians then retreated to Iraq.

Assyrians then launched a counterattack after gathering in Amediya, in the face of Turkish machine gun fire and artillery. Assyrians defeated the Turks in a series of battles and captured several towns in Iraq and the Turks retreated to their border. The victorious battles by the Assyrians in the face of incredible odds were described as incredible by observers.

Following attacks on units of the 7th Corps, the Turkish General Staff authorized the 7th Corps to enter the Zakho and Amadiya regions should air strikes continue north of Birsivi, Balona, and Çakallo—locations where British outposts were situated. On September 21, British aircraft attacked a camel caravan south of Shiranis.

In preparation for mobilization, the General Staff requested that the Ministry of National Defense dispatch the necessary weapons, ammunition, uniforms, and other supplies for the mobilization of the 7th and 5th Divisions; the 1st and 14th Cavalry Divisions and the 2nd and 17th Infantry Divisions (currently under the command of the 7th Corps); and the 34th Infantry Regiments (slated for deployment from the 28th, 36th, and 9th Corps) to their respective locations.

British warplanes then arrived and dropped bombs in Asheeta, ending the conflict.

== Aftermath ==
After the British bombed Asheeta, they ordered the Assyrians not to cross the Turkish border to attack and to come back to return to Iraq. Assyrians returned disappointed because the British did not live up to their word of helping them to occupy Southeastern Anatolia.

== Legacy ==
According to some sources, the Assyrian rebellion was much similar to that of the later Sheikh Said Rebellion in 1925. The Assyrian rebellion itself played an important role in modern Assyrian history, and goes down in history as the first ever rebellion against the newly formed Republic of Turkey. As the Turkish authorities expelled the Assyrian tribes of Tyari and Tkhuma, they made it clear that they were no longer welcome into the territory of the Turkish Republic.

== See also ==
- Sheikh Said Rebellion
- Malik Ismail II
- Republic of Turkey
