= Hakkari (historical region) =

Historical region of West Asia

Hakkari (Kurdish: حەکاری, Syriac: ܚܟܪܝ Ḥakkāri, or ܗܟܪܝ Hakkāri), was a historical mountainous region lying to the south of Lake Van, encompassing parts of the modern provinces of Hakkâri, Şırnak, Van in Turkey and Dohuk in Iraq. During the late Ottoman Empire it was a sanjak within the old Vilayet of Van.

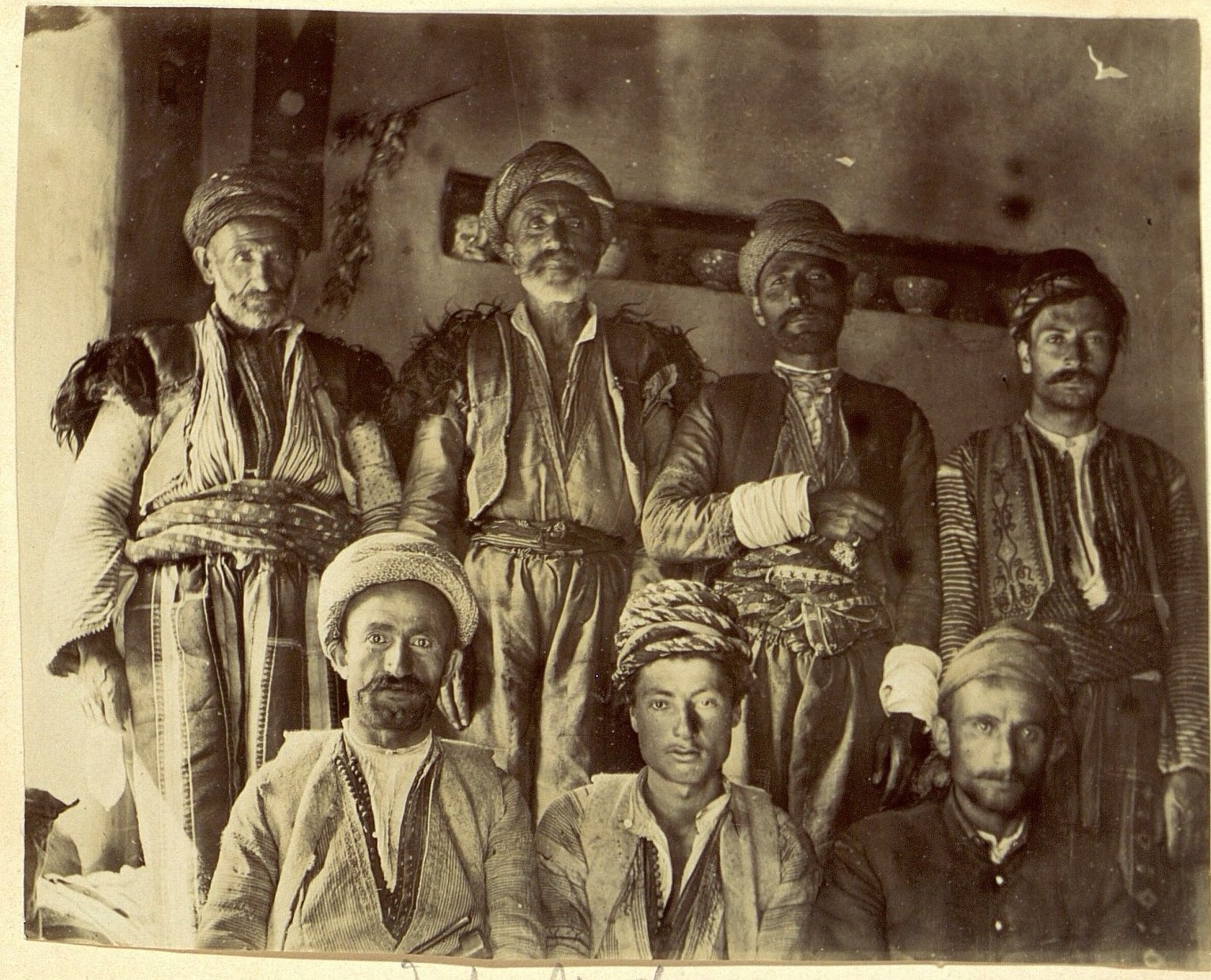
Hakkari Assyrians, c. 1900

== History ==
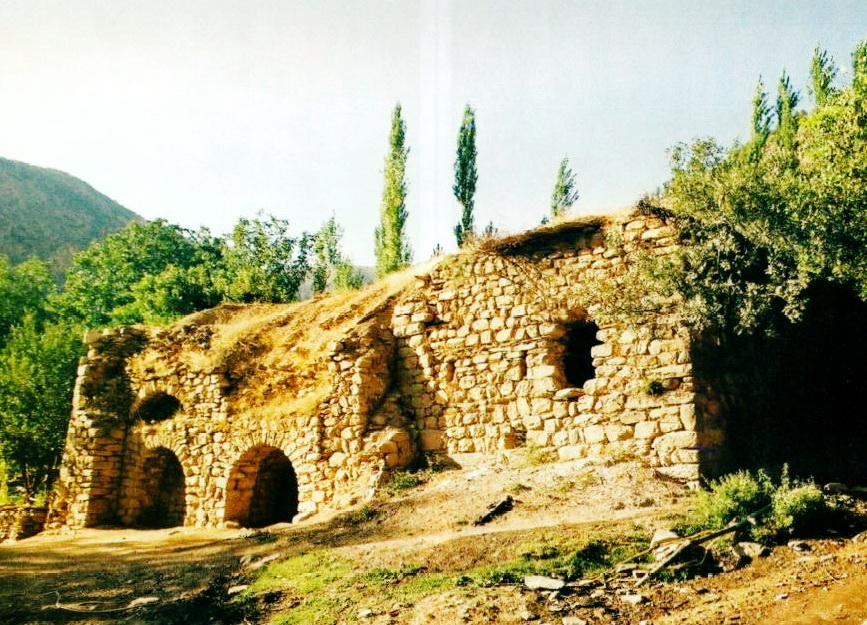
A 6th-century Assyrian church, in the Assyrian village of Geramon

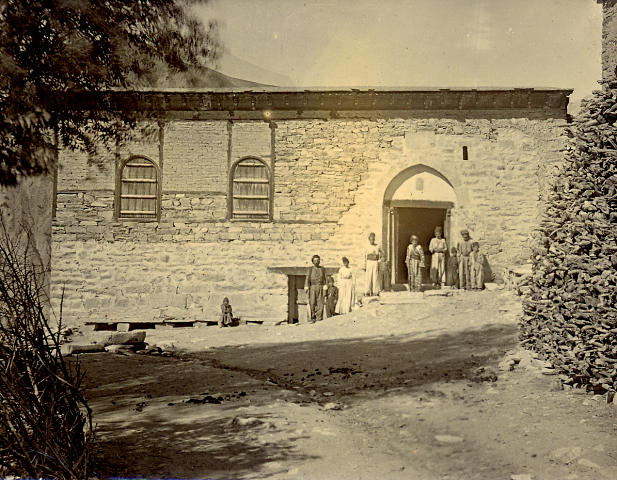
Residence of the Patriarch in Qudshanis, Ottoman Empire (1692–1918)

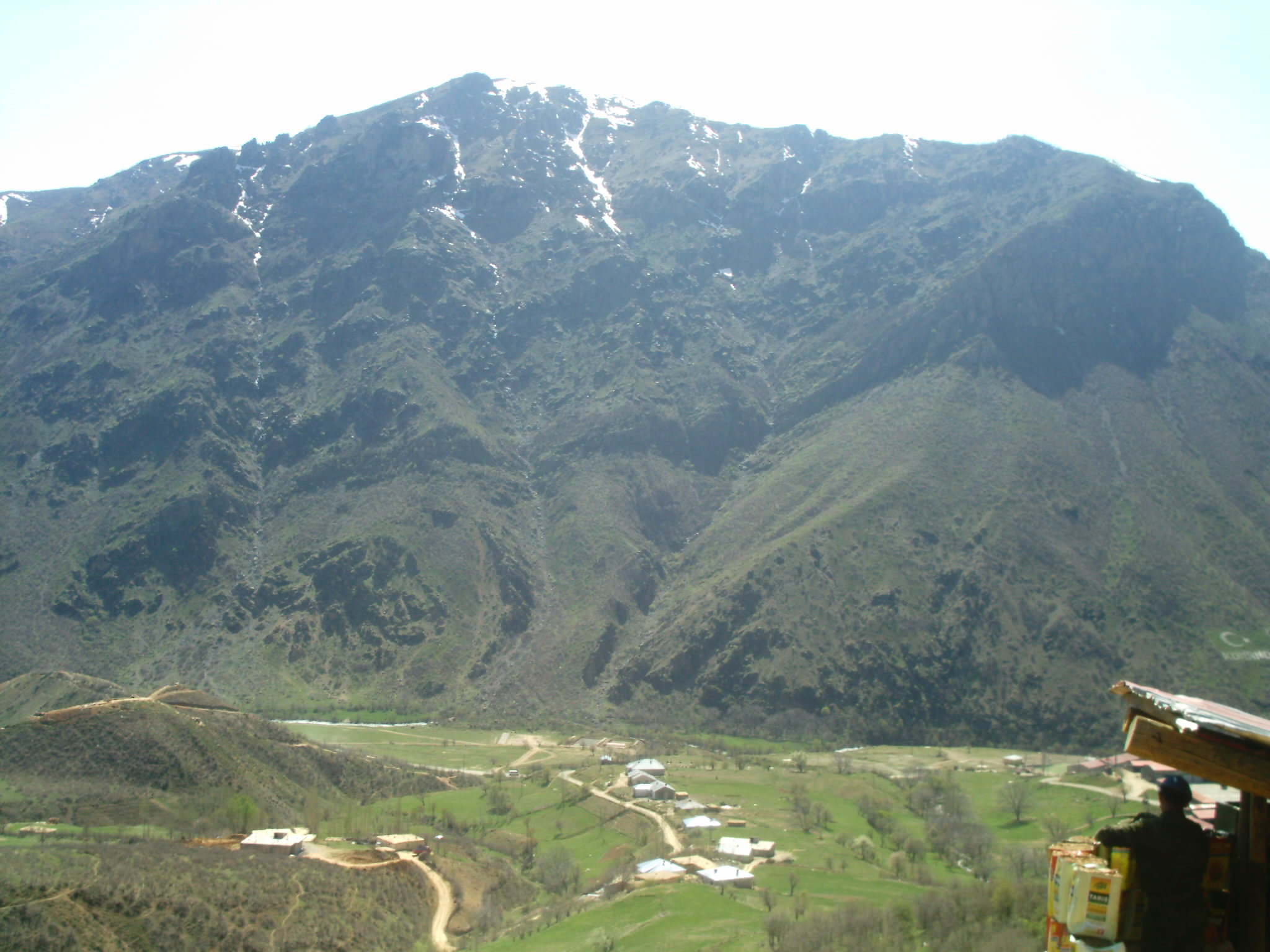
The mountainous Shemsdin district

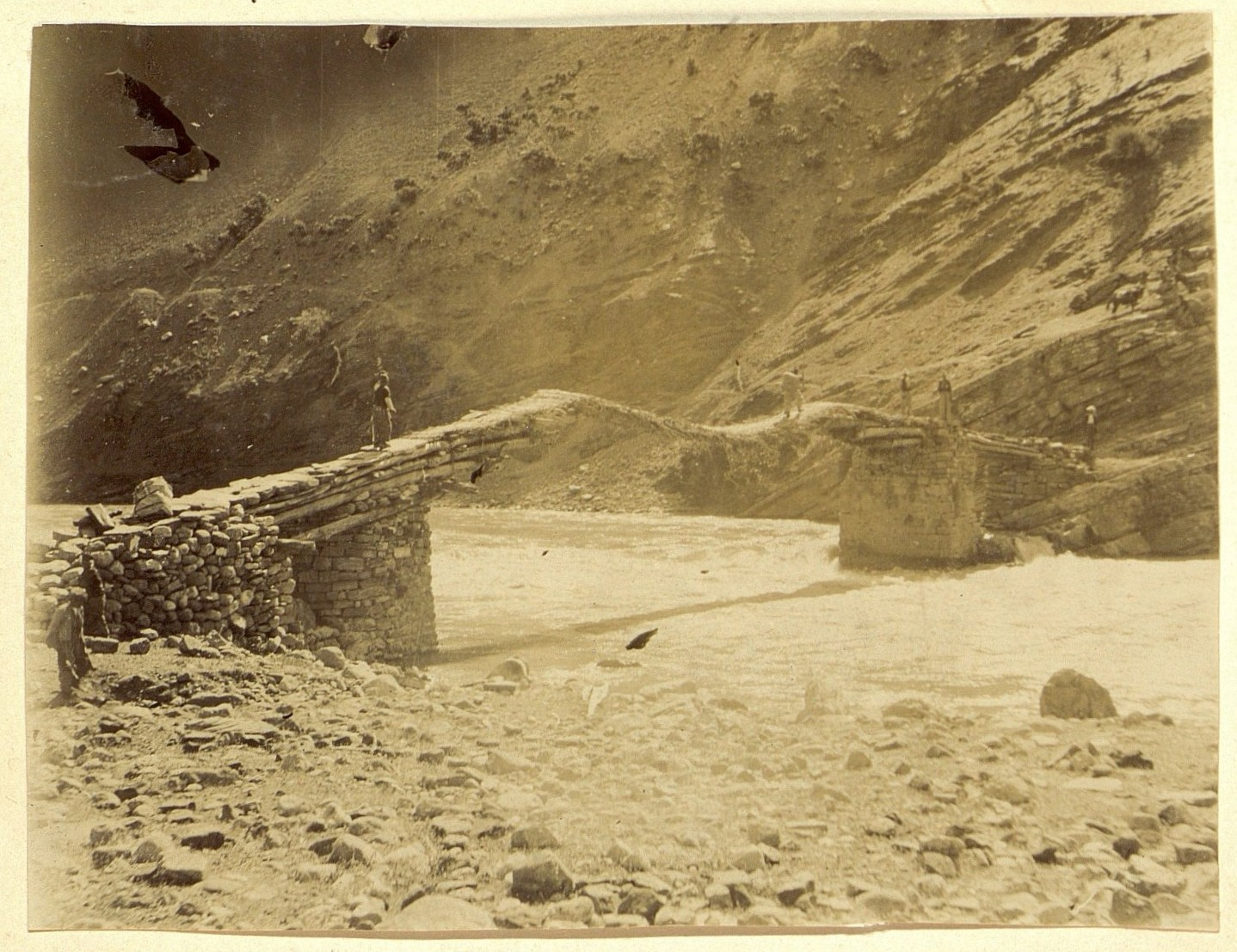
Basket woven bridge across the Zab in Hakkari, c. 1900

The region stretching from Tur Abdin to Hakkari formed the Nairi lands which served as the northern Assyrian frontier and border with their Urartian rivals. The Assyrians of this region were Christians adhering to the Assyrian Church of the East and lived here until 1924, when the last Assyrians who survived the Assyrian genocide and massacres that occurred during 1918 were expelled. Most subsequently moved to the Sapna and Nahla valleys in northern Iraq. Those who went to Simele ended up immigrating further to the Tell Tamer Subdistrict in Syria during the 1930s.

In 980AD, Adud al-Dawla sent an expedition against the Hakkari Kurds and subdued them. In 1041AD, after the defeat of the invading Oghuz turks and subsequent massacre in Urmia by Rawadids. They fled to Hakkari where they ravaged it. they were eventually defeated by the Kurds and 1500 Oghuz tribesmen were killed and the survivors were enslaved by the Kurds.

Following the devastation of the urban centres of Mesopotamia at the hands of Timur, a Turkic military leader operating under the guise of restoring the Mongol Empire, he was known as "the Sword of Islam." His conquest of Baghdad and the general area, especially the destruction of Tikrit, affected the Syrian Orthodox Church which sheltered near Nineveh at Mar Mattai Monastery following the destruction of Christians in the region, the Ismailis and Sunni and Shi'a Muslims indiscriminately by Timur during the second part of the 14th century. The few survivors sought refuge among the Assyrians of Hakkari and the surrounding region. This region also produced many bishops and patriarchs as hereditary succession was used to prevent a full ecclesiastical collapse of the church. By the 16th century, the Assyrians disappeared from many cities where they previously thrived, such as in Tabriz and Nisibis. The head of the Church of the East moved from Baghdad to Maragha in Urmia by 1553.

By the 1500s, the Assyrians were concentrated in an older version of the Assyrian triangle, with its points in Diyarbakir (west), Maragha (east). The Church of the East lost some of its members in the few centuries following the Schism of 1552 to the Chaldean Catholic Church, mainly in Diyarbakir. Those living in Hakkari, however, were unaffected by the disputes until 1692 when the Chaldean Archbishop of Diyarbakir Shimun IX Dinkha broke away from Rome and moved to Qudshanis in Hakkari where he reintroduced the Shimun line of hereditary patriarchial succession which continued until 1976.

Patriarch Shimun XIII moved his seat from Amid to Qochanis. After the final return to the traditional faith, Patriarchs of the Shimun line decided to keep their independence and after that time there were two independent lines of traditional patriarchs: the senior Eliya line in Alqosh and the junior Shimun line in Qochanis. Such division was additionally caused by the complex structure of local Assyrian communities, traditionally organized as tribal confederations with each tribe being headed by a local lord (malik), while each malik was ultimately subject to the patriarch, who mediated between Christian Assyrians and the Ottoman authorities.

The Patriarch residing in the Church of Mār Shalīṭa in Qudshanis enjoyed both spiritual and political power over his subjects. Since priests were required to remain celibates the patriarchy moved from uncle to nephew. This system came to be known as Nāṭar Kursyā (ܢܛܪ ܟܘܪܣܝܐ "Guardian of the throne"), and by the 19th century this system was applied to all dioceses of Hakkari. The Assyrians formed intricate alliances with neighbouring Kurdish tribes and their Ottoman lords, and each tribe was led by a Malik (ܡܠܟ) who also functioned as a military leader during wartime. The Tyari Assyrians lived across 51 different villages and constituted 50,000 members - making it the most powerful among the semi-independent Assyrian tribes.

=== Kurdish wars ===
In the 19th century, several competing Kurdish centers began emerging in the region. Mir Muhammed, the Kurdish Emir of the Soran Emirate situated around Rawanduz, was able to depose his rivals and control a region stretching from Mardin to Persian Azerbaijan. However, he was defeated in battle when he tried to subdue the Assyrians of Hakkari in 1838. The Ottomans, seeking to consolidate their control of the region, engaged him in a costly war which eventually led to the dissolution of his Emirate.

After the fall of his main rival Mir Muhammed, Bedir Khan Beg, the last Kurdish Emir of the Emirate of Bohtan, sought to extend his dominion by annexing the Assyrian regions in Hakkari. He took advantage of a rift between the Patriarch of the Assyrian Church of the East, Shimun XVII Abraham, and Nurullah Beg, the last Kurdish Emir of the Emirate of Hakkâri. Bedir Khan Beg allied with Nurullah Beg and massacred the Assyrians of Hakkari in the summer of 1843, taking those who survived as slaves, and inflicted another massacre in 1846 on the Assyrians of Tiyari, also residing in Hakkari. The Western powers, alarmed by the massacres, pressured the Ottomans to intervene: Bedir Khan Beg was subsequently defeated and exiled to Crete the following year, in 1847.

=== Direct Ottoman control ===
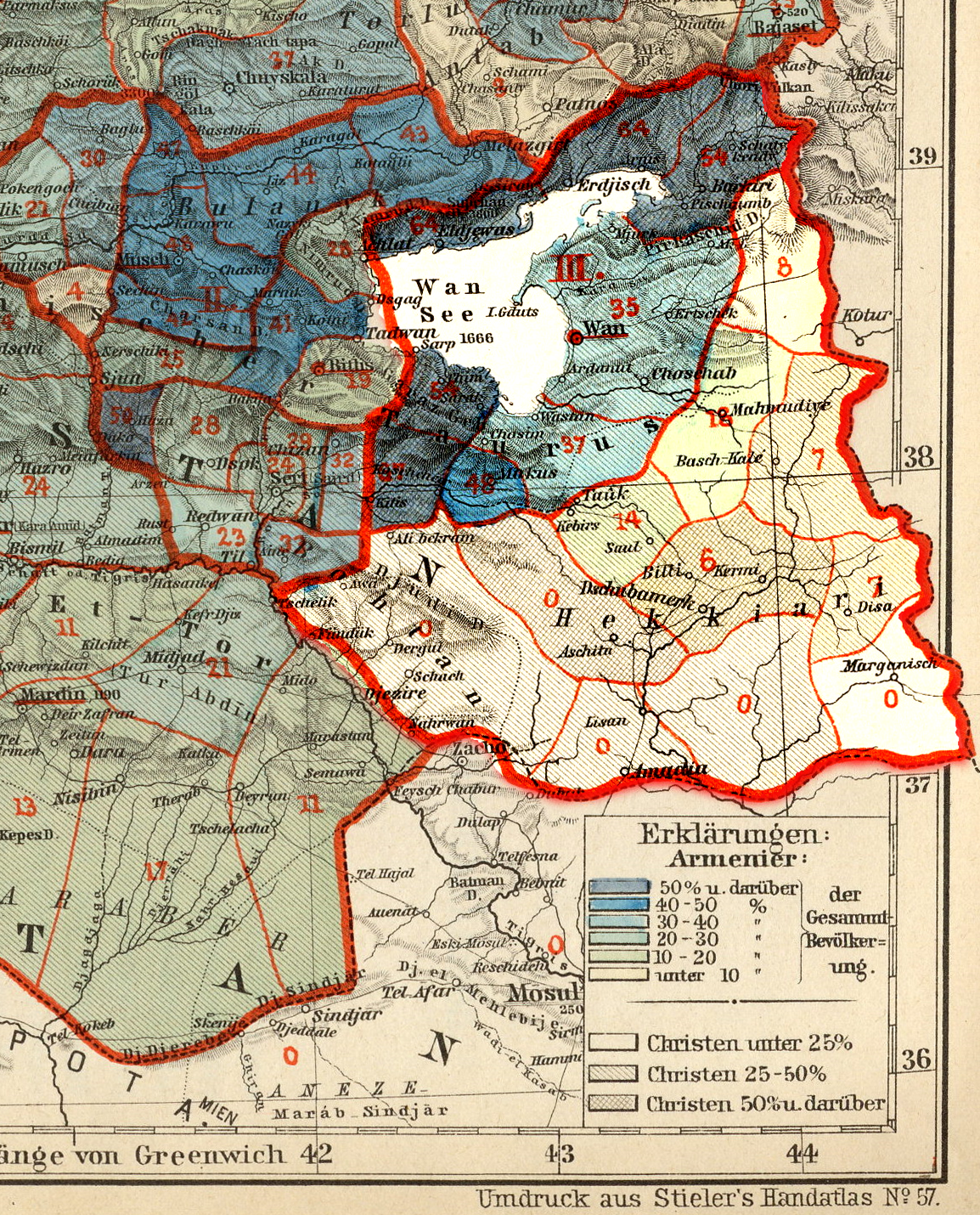
The checkered Christian districts southeast of Lake Van is where the Assyrians of Hakkari lived, while the Christian districts in Blue designate where Armenians lived

Although the region was nominally under Ottoman control since the 16th century, it was in reality administered by its Assyrian and Kurdish inhabitants and their lords. The situation changed after the Badr Khans rule and the Tanzimat reforms as the Ottomans now were able to extend their full control unopposed, and in 1868 the Sanjak of Hakkari was created.

=== Genocide and exodus ===
On the eve of the First World War, patriarch Shimun XIX Benyamin was promised preferential treatment in anticipation of the war. Shortly after the war began, however, Assyrian and Armenian settlements to the north of Hakkari were attacked and sacked by Kurdish irregulars allied with the Ottoman Army in the Assyrian genocide. Others were forced into labour battalions and later executed.

The turning point was when the patriarch's brother was taken prisoner as he was studying in Constantinople. The Ottomans demanded Assyrian neutrality and executed him as a warning. In return, the patriarch declared war on the Ottomans on 10 April 1915.

The Assyrians were immediately attacked by Kurdish irregulars backed by the Ottomans, driving most of the Assyrians of Hakkari to the mountain tops, as those who stayed in their villages were killed. Shimun Benjamin was able to move unnoticed to Urmia, which at the time was under Russian control, and tried to persuade them to send a relief force to the besieged Assyrians. When the Russians replied that the request was unreasonable, he returned to Hakkari and led the surviving 50,000 Assyrians through the mountains to safety in Urmia. Thousands perished from cold and hunger during this march.

=== After the First World War ===
During the peace conferences in Paris in 1919, the Assyrians asked for a state in Diyarbekir and northern Mesopotamia in Iraq; others requested a British protectorate in Upper Mesopotamia, northern Mosul, and Urmia. The Assyrians tried to retake the region, but the Turks and Kurds objected to their desire to retake their ancestral lands in Hakkari, and an attempt to occupy the region by Agha Petros failed. In 1924, after a rebellion, Turkey formally occupied northern Hakkari and expelled the last Christian inhabitants who still remained in the region, with the exception of the village of Gaznakh which due to Kurdish alliances and their conversion to the Chaldean Catholic Church avoided deportation. Assyrians still live in the southern Hakkari region of Barwari Bala, now straddling the Turkey-Iraq border, and in the Sapna and Nahla Valleys of Iraqs Nohadra region.

== Economy ==
As of 1920, Hakkari was producing lead. The lead, which came from a government owned mine, was used to make bullets.

== See also ==
- List of Assyrian tribes
- Tyari
- Barwari
- Shemsdin (East Syriac ecclesiastical province)
- Assyrian homeland
