= Tyari =

Assyrian tribe and historical district in Hakkari

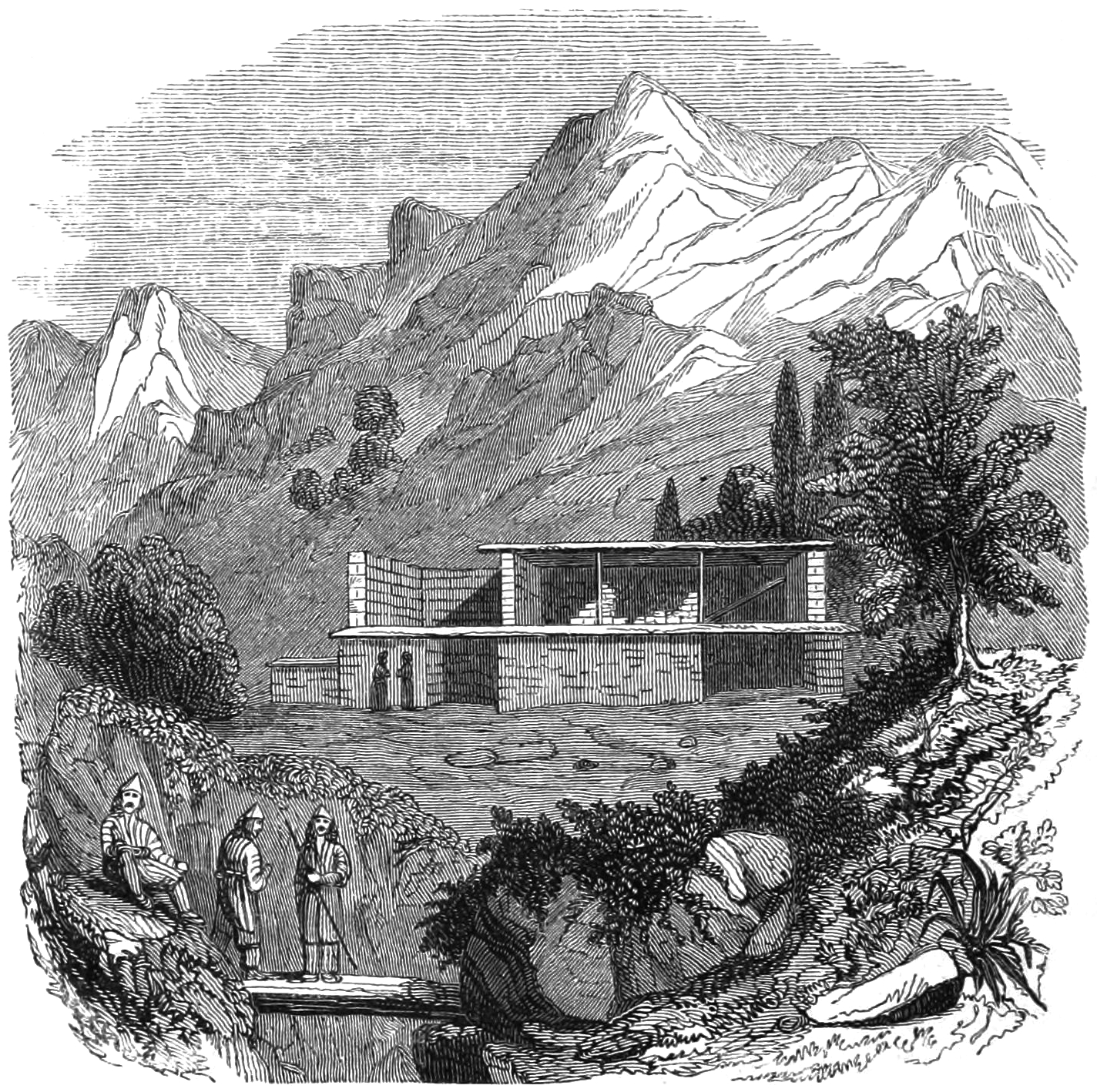
An Assyrian house in the Tyari, from The Assyrians and their Rituals (1852), vol. I, p. 216

Tyari (Note: Also spelled with a final -e or -y in place of -i, with a -i- or -iy- in place of -y-, or with any combination thereof (e.g. Tiare, Tiari, Tiyare, etc.).) (Syriac: ܛܝܵܪܹܐ, romanized: Ṭyārē) is an Assyrian tribe and a historical district within Hakkari, Turkey. The area was traditionally divided into Upper Tyari (Tyari Letha) and Lower Tyari (Tyari Khtetha)–each consisting of several Assyrian villages. Both Upper and Lower Tyari are located on the western bank of the Zab river. Today, the district mostly sits in around the town of Çukurca. Historically, the largest village of the region was known as Ashitha. According to Hannibal Travis the Tyari Assyrians were known for their skills in weaving and knitting.

Before 1915, Tyari was home to Assyrians from the Bet Tyari tribe as well as a minority of Kurds and Armenians. Following the Assyrian genocide, Ṭyārāyē, along with other Assyrians residing in the Hakkari highlands, were forced to leave their villages in southeast Anatolia and fled to join their fellow Assyrian brethren in modern-day northern Iraq (Sarsink, Sharafiya, Chammike and various villages in the Nahla valley), northeastern Syria (Tel Tamer and Al Hasakah), Armenia, Georgia and, from the late 20th century, to western countries. The Tyari tribe was, according to Robert Elliot Speer, one of the Assyrian "ashirets". In 1869 there were 15,000 Tyari Assyrians living in 2,500 houses in the Tyari district according to John George Taylor in a report to the Earl of Clarendon. The Tyari Assyrians lived across 51 different villages and constituted 50,000 members - making it the most powerful among the semi-independent Assyrian tribes. The Tyari district is located in the boundaries of the ancient Neo-Assyrian kingdom of Adiabene.

It is worth particular notice that the most central parts of this region are, and have been from time immemorial, entirely inhabited by the Nestorians, to the exclusion of every other class of people. A great part of the Independent tribes of Tiari [Tiyari] and the whole of the tribes of Tekhoma, Bass, Jelu and other smailer tribes, are included in the boundaries of Adiabene.

— Asahel Grant, "The Nestorians, Or, the Lost Tribes", (1841)

== Etymology ==
Tyari may be a variation of the ancient "Autiyara" (Assyria). American historian Albert T. Olmstead describes in his work History of the Persian Empire how the Persian General Vaumisa wins a battle in the Autiyara districts located in Tyari and mentions that this is where Assyrian Christians maintained independence until modern times.

In Syriac, the word ṭyārē (ܛܝܪ̈ܐ) is the plural form of ṭyārā, meaning "sheepfold" or "grazing area". Indeed, the Assyrians of Tyari were renowned even amongst neighboring Kurds and Armenians for their yogurt, cheese and other dairy products mostly made from sheep or goat's milk. They were also famous for their textiles, which again were spun and woven from sheep's wool. They also made woolen felt for their characteristic conical caps, a style dating back to the Assyrian Empire.

== Military engagements ==
One of the reasons the Assyrians of Tyari were able to stay independent for so long despite being significantly outnumbered by Turks, Kurds and Arab Muslims was their fighting ability. The Assyrians of Tyari were especially known for being a fierce, warlike people. It was said that they were the best fighters in West Asia, along with the Assyrian tribe of Tkhuma. Their Muslim neighbors stated that in order to stand a chance they needed to outnumber the Assyrians of Tyari or Tkhuma five to one, and have superior modern weapons. Assyrians of Tyari used much older weaponry and manufactured their own weapons and ammunition.

In 1834 the leader of the Soran Emirate Muhammad Pasha of Rawanduz tried to subdue the Assyrians of Lower Tyari, but suffered a humiliating defeat at the hands of the vastly outnumbered Assyrians. They then chased the Kurds and Turks back to Amadiya. This defeat played a major role in the collapse of the Soran Emirate.

In 1844, Kurds from the Chull region seized fifty sheep from the Nestorian settlement of Matha’d Kasra. Shortly afterward, Bedirhan Bey dispatched three hundred men to Berawola, where they took 1,050 more sheep. As a result of these raids, only a small number of livestock remained in the Tiyari region. During their travels through the mountains, the missionaries Smith and Laurie passed a village that had been attacked by Kurds at midnight the previous day.

In 1880, Ubeydullah's militia, with the support of mercenaries from the Tyari tribe, invaded the northwestern Kurdish territories of Qajar dynasty in attempt to expand his control.

In 1907 the Ottomans sent troops to Hakkari to stop fighting between the Assyrians of Tyari and Kurds. The Ottoman troops were successful in subduing the Kurds. The Assyrians of Tyari, however, defeated them and the Ottomans were routed and had their weapons seized.

In 1915, the Assyrian tribes of Lower and Upper Tyari were attacked by Ottoman troops from Mosul under Vali Haydar Bey, supported by Kurdish irregulars. At the same time, the kaymakam of Djulemerk and the Artosh Kurds launched an assault on Upper Tyari. The Assyrians were forced to abandon their valleys, seeking refuge in higher mountains and later in Persia, where many perished en route. Rashid Bey of Barwari Bala was noted for his particular violence during this campaign, devastating Lower Tyari and murdering Malik Yosip, the father of Malik Khoshaba.

Following the Assyrian Genocide of World War One which began in 1915, the Tyareh tribe, along with all other Assyrians took part in the Assyrian War of Independence against the offending Ottoman Empire and their Kurdish and Arab allies, allying themselves with the British, Russians and Armenians (victims of the Armenian Genocide). The Tyareh, under Malik Khoshaba took part in scoring a number of notable victories against the Ottomans and Kurds despite being heavily outnumbered and outgunned. However Following the Russian withdrawal after the Russian Revolution in 1917 and the collapse of Armenian lines the Tyareh and other northern Assyrian tribes were forced to fight their way to British lines in Northern Mesopotamia and Northern Persia.

In the early 1930s, the Assyrians consisting mainly of Tyarayeh and Tkhoumnayeh successfully defeated the Iraqi army in Dairabun killing 33 and wounding 40, including three officers, while the Assyrians suffered significantly less losses. The Iraqis were armed with modern weapons and attack planes given to them by the British, while the Assyrians were only equipped with old rifles.

In the 1930s, the Iraqis admitted that one Assyrian soldier was equal to three Arab soldiers and saw the Assyrians as a huge threat to Iraq militarily if Assyrians went against the British.

== Dialect ==
The dialect of Tyari belongs to the Ashiret group, along with the dialects of e.g. Tkhuma and Baz, of the Northeastern Neo-Aramaic (NENA) dialects. Like Jīlū, the Tyari dialect is a very distinct Assyrian Neo-Aramaic dialect. Unlike the Jilu, Baz and Gawar dialects (which are very similar to each other), this one is more "thick". It is, in a way, a sort of a "working class" accent of the Assyrian dialects. Dialects within Tyari, and especially the Western group, have more in common with Chaldean Neo-Aramaic than with Iraqi Koine (similar to General Urmian). The Tyari dialect is divided into two main sub-dialects; upper Tyari and lower Tyari.

Many Tyari speakers can switch back and forth from Tyari to "Assyrian Standard" (or "Iraqi Koine") when conversing with Assyrian speakers of other dialects. Some speakers tend to adopt a form of verb conjugation that is closer to the Iraqi Koine or Urmian Standard. This is attributed to the growing exposure to Assyrian Standard-based literature, media, and its use as a liturgical language by the Assyrian Church of the East. Furthermore, it is customary for Assyrian artists to generally sing in Iraqi Koine for them to be intelligible and have widespread recognition. Songs in Tyari dialects are usually of the folk-dance music genre and would attract certain audiences.

Examples in Tyari compared to Koine
English	Assyrian Koine	Tyari dialect
Hair	'ch:osa	'chawsa
Pigeon	'yo:na	'yawna
Fasting	'so:ma	'sawma
Benefit	'ph:ayda	'pheda
Body	'phaġra	'phaxra
Lord	'a:ġa	'a:xa
Rank	'darġa	'darxa

Examples
English	Tyari dialect	Note
House	Bεθα	This is also common in the village of Araden
Her house	Bεθα diya	This is also common in the village of Araden
He descends	ṣāle	
He rises	qā'im	
He does not drink	la-šate-Ø (Ashitha)	le-šate-Ø (Halmun)
Death	mθta (Ashitha)	mawθta (Halmun)
Illness	maṛ'a	
Wool	´amṛa	
She says	´amra	

Examples of /*ṯ/ shift to /š/
English	Tyari dialect	Assyrian Koine
Chicken	kṯεša	ܟܬܵܬ݂ܵܐ / ktatha
Oil	zεša	ܙܲܝܬܵܐ / zéta
Drink	štεša	ܫܬܵܝܬܵܐ / shtéta

=== Suffixes ===
Although possessive affixes (beti - "my house") are more convenient and common among Assyrian speakers, those with Tyari and Barwari dialects take a more analytic approach regarding possession, just like modern Hebrew and English.

== Villages and sub-clans in Tyari ==
Upper Tyari
Clan	Bne Qalatha	Dadoshoshnaye	Bne Roomta	Walto	Single Village Clans
Sub-clan or settlement	Qalatha	Dadosh	Mar Sawa	Serta	Siadohr (Siyador)
Sub-clan or settlement	Chamba D'Malik	Mabua	Sarispeedon	Matha D Mat Mariam	Koe (Ko)
Sub-clan or settlement	Malota	Bet Mariggo	Roomta	Khadiana	Kokha
Sub-clan or settlement	Chamba D'Hasso	Chamikta		Resha D'Nahra	Mazrogeh
Sub-clan or settlement	Chamba D'Nene			Shwawootha	
Sub-clan or settlement	Chamba D'Elia			Darawa	
Sub-clan or settlement				Ishta D'Nahra	
Sub-clan or settlement				Zorawa	

Lower Tyari
Clan	Bne Be-Alahta	Bne-Matha	Bne-Lagippa	Ashita	Bne Rawel	Single Village Clans
Sub-clan or settlement	Be-Alahta	Lizan	Lagippa	Be-Marqus	Rawel (Ravole)	Minianish
Sub-clan or settlement	Salabakkan (Ravola d-Salabkhan)	Zarne	Kurkhe	Be-Qasha-Khoshaba	Shurt (Shurd)	Zawitha
Sub-clan or settlement		Matha D'Qasra	Chamba d-Be-Susina	Be-Odishka		Borish
Sub-clan or settlement				Nashe d-Matha		
Sub-clan or settlement				Chammanaye		
Sub-clan or settlement				Khatibnaye		
Sub-clan or settlement				Be-Rabin		
Sub-clan or settlement				Be-Merwatte		

=== Division of sub-clans and settlements according to the Diocese of Mar Shimun ===
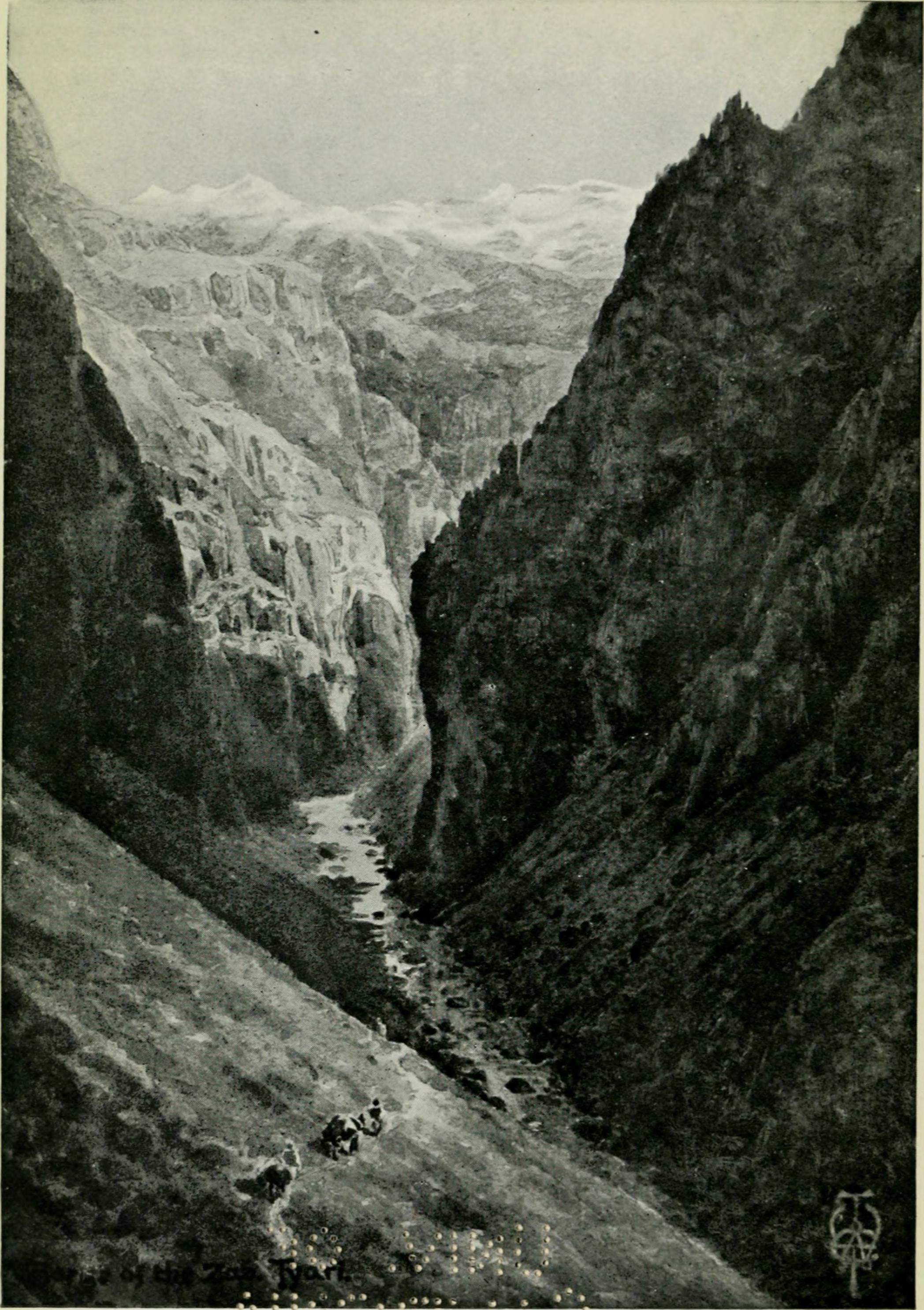
"The view down stream from the mouth of the Ori valley, a little above Tal. The distant snow peak is Ghara Dagh on the southern side of Tkhuma."

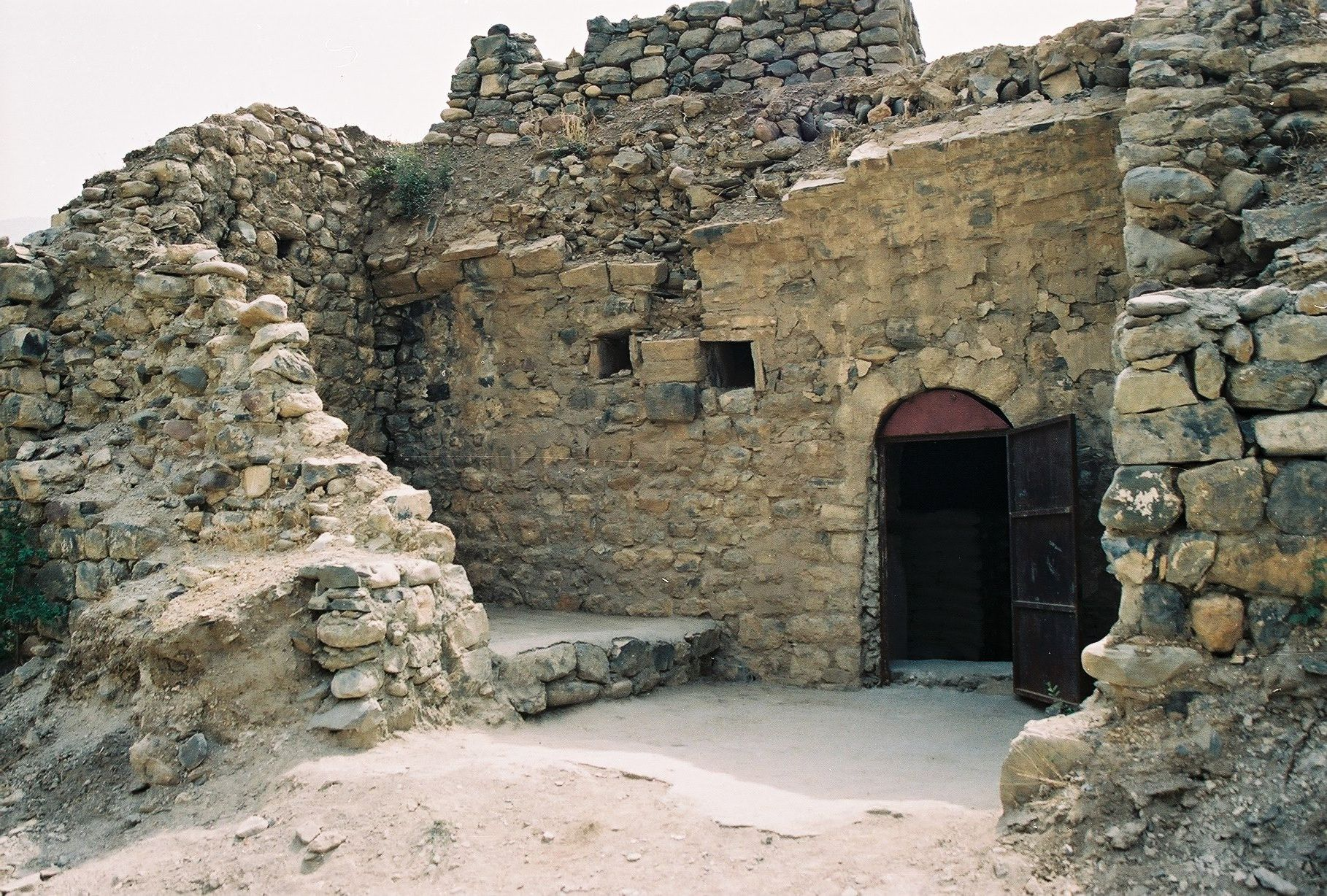
Assyrian church of St. George in Lizan, Lower Tyare.

Lower Tyari:

- Garamoon
- Halamoon
- Tcalluk
- Arosh
- Hor
- Teire Rezen
- Asheetha (Ashita)
- Barwar (Barwari Bala)
- Zaweetha
- Minyanish
- Merghe
- Kurkhe
- Leezan (Lizan)
- Oomra Tahtiya
- Zerni
- Karukhta
- Chamba d'Beth Soseena
- Matha d'Kasra
- Be-Zeezo
- Lagippa
- Be-Alahta
- Bne-Matha
- Be-Rawole (Rawel, Ravula)
- Shoord
- Rawloa d'Salabeken

Walto:

- Chamba Hadtha
- Zorawa
- Seerta
- Shwawootha
- Matha d'Mart Miriam
- Khadiana
- Reshe d'Nahra

Upper Tyari:

- Serspeedho
- Siyadhor
- Chamba d' Be Ellia
- Chamba d'Nene
- Chamba d'Coordhaye
- Mezzraa
- Mrateetha
- Be-Nahra
- Be-Zrako
- Roomta
- Jeiatha
- Reshe d'Nahra
- Aina d'Aleete
- Doora Allaya
- Kalaytha
- Mezraa d'Kalaytha
- Chamba d'Melek
- Be-Dalyatha
- Dadosh
- Mabbuaa
- Ko
- Chamba dKoodkhe
- Be-Meriggo
- Roma Smoka
- Chamba d'Hasso
- Darawa
- Malota

== Clothing ==
Assyrian fighter in the 1890s from the Tyari tribe.

- About the national dress worn by the Tyari men in the Bakuba camp, Brigadier-General Austin wrote; "Fine upstanding fellows they are, ...their legs, encased in long loose baggy trousers of a greyish hue originally, but so patched all over with bits of blue, red, green and other colors that their pants are veritable patch work. A broad cloth, "Kammar band," or waist band, is folded several times round the trunk of the body, and a short cut-away jacket of amazing colors, worn over a thin cotton variegated shirt. The head-dress consists of conical felt cap as depicted in frescoes of Assyrians of thousands of years ago, and which has survived to this day."
- "Among them are a number of Tyari men, whose wild looks, combined with the splendour of their dress and arms, are a great interest. […] Their jackets are one mass of gold embroidery (worked by Jews), their shirts, with hanging sleeves, are striped with satin, their trousers, of sailor cut, are silk, made from the cocoons of their own silkworms, woven with broad crimson stripes on a white ground, on which is a zigzag pattern; and their handsome jack-boots are of crimson leather. With they white or red peaked fell hats and twisted silk pagris, their rich girdles, jewelled daggers, and inlaid pistols, they are very imposing."
- Isabella L. Bird wrote in her work "Journeys In Persia And Kurdistan" about a Tyari man wearing a white conical cap.

On his head, where one would have expected to see a college “trencher”, was a high conical cap of white felt with a pagri of black silk twisted into a rope, the true Tyari turban.

— Isabella L. Bird, "Journeys In Persia and Kurdistan", (1891)

== Famous Tyari Assyrians ==
=== Bishops and priests ===
- Mar Addai II, Catholicos-Patriarch of the Ancient Church of the East - Ashitha, Lower Tyari
- Mar Gewargis III Sliwa, Catholicos-Patriarch of the Assyrian Church of the East - Ashitha, Lower Tyari
- Mar Narsai Toma, Metropolitan of Kirkuk of the Ancient Church of the East - Lagippa, Lower Tyari
- Mar Toma Giwargis, Metropolitan of Nineveh of the Ancient Church of the East - Matha D'Qasra, Lower Tyari
- Mar Daniel Yakob, Bishop of California of the Ancient Church of the East - Ashitha, Lower Tyari
- Mar Yacoub Daniel, Metropolitan of Australia and New Zealand of the Ancient Church of the East - Ashitha, Lower Tyari
- Mar Emmanuel Elia, former Bishop of North America of the Ancient Church of the East - Ashitha, Lower Tyari
- Mar Zaia Khoshaba, Metropolitan of North America of the Ancient Church of the East - Lagippa, Lower Tyari
- Mar Aprem Daweed, former Bishop of Dohuk of the Ancient Church of the East - Ashitha, Lower Tyari
- Mar Gewargis Younan, Bishop of Chicago of the Ancient Church of the East - Minyanish, Lower Tyari
- Mar Odisho Oraham, Bishop of Western Europe of the Assyrian Church of the East - Rumta, Upper Tyari
- Mar Aprem Natniel, Bishop of Syria of the Assyrian Church of the East - Sarespido, Upper Tyari

=== Assyrian Lawyers ===
- Oliver Slewa Qaraya

=== Assyrian Singers ===
- Adwar Mousa
- Juliana Jendo
- Linda George
- Sargon Gabriel
- George Homeh

=== Assyrian tribal leaders ===
- Malik Khoshaba Yosip, (Lower Tyari)
- Malik Ismail II (Upper Tyari)
- Rais Khiyo Odisho (Chammānāyā)
- Malik Barkho (Bé-Allatha)
- Hurmiz Malik Chikko (Dadoshnāyā)
- Malik Yaqo d'Malik Ismael, (Upper Tyari)
- Zadoq Nwiya, (Ashitha, Lower Tyari)
- Sayfo Keena, (Bnay l'Gippa, Lower Tyari)
- Rayis Booko, (Ashitha, Lower Tyari)
- Rayis Yawp Sawkho, (Chamba, Upper Tyari)
- Rayis Warda Oshana, (Rarwa, Upper Tyari)
- Lazar Marqus (Ashitha, Lower Tyari)

== See also ==
- List of Assyrian tribes
- List of Assyrian settlements
- Assyrian independence movement
- Barwari
- Jilu
- Nochiya
- Öveç, Şemdinli
- Beyyurdu, Şemdinli
