= Dawid Mar Shimun =

Assyrian military leader

Rab Khaila (Commander) Dawid Mar Shimun ܕܘܝܕ ܡܪܝ ܫܡܥܘܢ
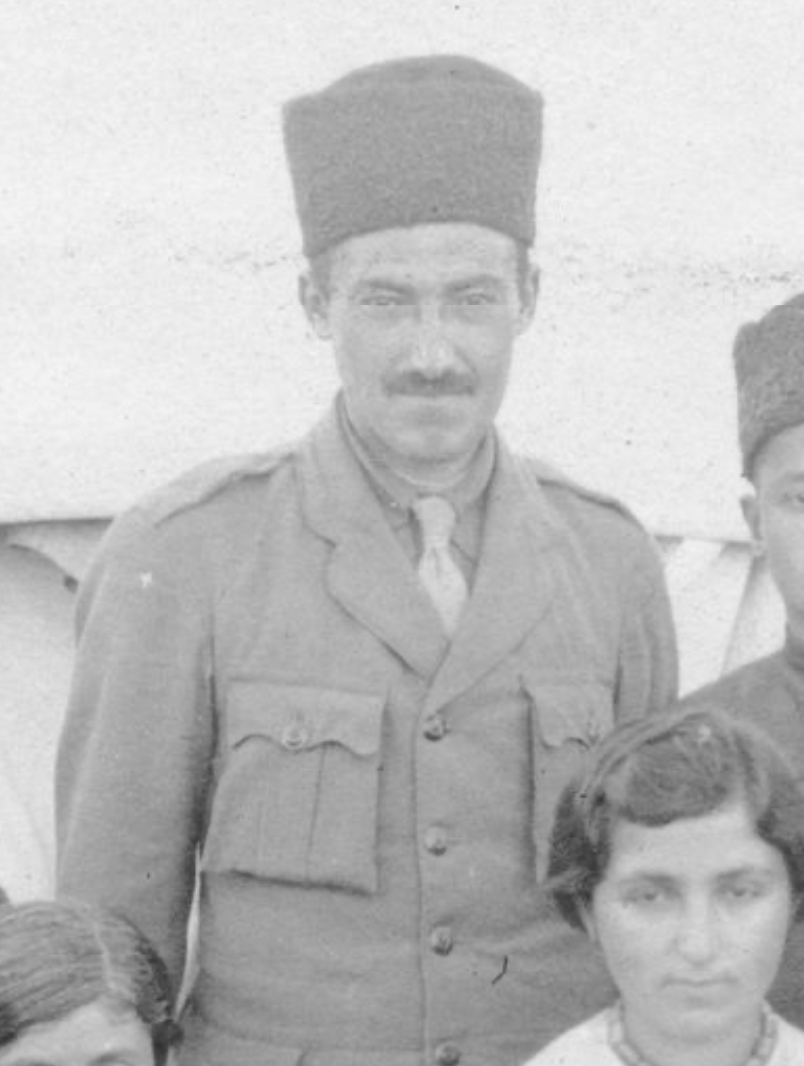
- Dawid Mar Shimun in Baquba
- Born: 1889; Qodshanis, Hakkari, Ottoman Empire
- Died: 21 October 1974 (aged 84–85); San Francisco, United States of America
- Spouse: Esther De Matran (1904–1974)
- Children: Mar Eshai Shimun XXIII; Theodore Mar Shimun; Sargina Yohanan
- Relatives: Mar Shimun XIX Benyamin (Brother); Mar Shimun XX Paulos (Brother); Surma D'Bait Mar Shimun (Sister); Mar Shimun XVIII Rouel (Uncle)
- Military career
- Allegiance: Allies of World War I, Assyrian volunteers during World War I, later on the Assyrian Levies
- Service years: 1914–1933
- Rank: Rab Khaila (Commander)
- Commands: Rab Tremma (Commander of 200) Rab Khaila (Commander)
- Conflicts: World War I; Persian Campaign; Hakkari Expedition 1916; Hakkari Expedition 1917; Battle of Charah; Mahmud Barzanji revolts
- Awards: Order of the British Empire

Dawid Mar Shimun (Syriac: ܕܘܝܕ ܡܪܝ ܫܡܥܘܢ) was an Assyrian military leader from World War I up until the Simele Massacre in 1933 when he was exiled to Cyprus along with his son Mar Eshai Shimun. His first hand experience and contribution during the years leading up to the family's exile to Cyprus in 1933 cannot be overlooked, for his presence was common place beside the Patriarchs (Mar Benyamin Shimun XIX, Mar Paulos Shimun XXII and Mar Eshai Shimun XXIII) and his sister, Lady Surma.

== Early life ==
Rab Khaila Dawid d’Mar Shimun was born in Qudchanis, located in South East Turkey in 1889. His parents, Eshai and Asyat had eight children, two of which were patriarchs, Mar Benyamin Shimun XXI and Mar Paulos Shimun XXII. Dawid was trained in the military arts and discipline at an early age in which he later took his place as one of the primary advisors to both of his brothers and his son, the last of the three patriarchs from the d’Mar Shimun succession.

In 1904, Dawid married Lady Esther De Matran, sister of Mar Yosip Khnanisho. They had twelve children, starting with Theodore in 1906 and Eshai Shimun XXIII, Catholicos Patriarch in 1908.

== World War I ==
Agha Petros was given command of the left wing of the army of Assyrian volunteers (the right wing being commanded by Dawid, the center being under the command of Mar Benyamin Shimun).

On May 21, 1916 Malik Ismail II and Malik Khoshaba with their fighters left the district of Urmia for Salamas, there they met Dawid and Malik Shamisdin. On the 23rd of the month they left on the road to Khanasor to the town of Bashgalan. On the 27' of May they arrived at the village of Qudshanis and found that whole territory empty of the enemy, that is from the fort of Albaq to Qudshanis. In Qudshanis there were one thousand Russian Cossacks guarding those borders temporarily. From Qudshanis the Assyrian forces split into two branches, the first under the leadership of Malik Ismael, went on the road to Khananis and Aselayeh to Darawa. The second branch with Dawid, Malik Shamisdin and Malik Oshana of Tkhuma. They went on the road to the city of Julamerg. They laid down a bridge on the Great Zab river and crossed it on the way to the valley of Tal, to Tkhuma. That territory was also in ruins and empty of inhabitants. There both Assyrian forces met up with each other in the village of Chal. After a fierce battle six of the best and most inaccessible castles were destroyed by the Assyrians, after crushing and tearing apart the enemy, along with a part of their established homes.

On October 22, 1916 The Russian Palkonik (Colonel) Kondriatoff gave orders to Dawid to send a battalion of a thousand to Gawar for the destruction of the Valley of Hark. Here Malik Khoshaba of Lizan was assigned commander of the battalion by Patriarch Mar Benyamin. He accepted the order to take his one thousand to Gawar and destroy the Valley of Hark. They marched to Gawar and from there to Neery the capital of the province of Shamisdin. In the evening they arrived at the foot of a mountain occupied by the enemy. Rab trimma (commander of 200) Daniel of Malik Ismail and Rayis (chief) Boko Oshana of Asheeta attacked. The enemy was crushed with many of them killed, The whole valley was destroyed.

Suto agha of the Kurdish Oramar tribe actively participated in the mass slaughter of Assyrian Christians in the region, the Assyrians retaliated against Suto and, in early September 1917, he was besieged at Oramar by an army led by Agha Petros whilst an army led by Dawid attacked from another direction, killing 16 and capturing 30 Kurds, and suffered one death and two wounded. The village had fallen to the Assyrian forces by the time an additional force led by the patriarch arrived, but Suto and a number of Kurds fled to Nervi. Assyrian women who had been held captive by Suto were released from his harem, and Assyrian forces under the patriarch's command pursued Suto westward whilst Agha Petros marched east.

=== Battle of Charah ===
On 16 March 1918 he participated in the Battle of Charah in an attempt to avenge his brother Mar Benyamin Shimun after he was assassinated by Simko Shikak.

After the surrender of thousands Turkish prisoners on 12 of September 1918 1,500 Assyrian fighting under the command of Dawid joined the British in the city of Hamadan.

== Later life ==
From 1933 until 1954 the family lived in Cyprus and later moved to England, until 1960. In 1960 the family immigrated to the United States, settling in San Francisco until his death in 1974. In 1920 several dispatches were signed by Winston Churchill, In 1925, Dawid was promoted to the rank of Rab Khaila (Commander/Force Leader) for the Assyrian Levies, in their vital but overlooked role supporting the Allies. Throughout his military career serving his people Dawid was recognized with various medals including receiving a Military Order of the British Empire (M.B.E.) in 1928.
