= Assyrian independence movement =

Flag of the Assyrian Nation, designed in 1968 and adopted by major Assyrian organizations by 1971.

The Assyrian independence movement is a political movement and ethno-nationalist desire of ethnic Assyrians to live in their indigenous Assyrian homeland in northern Mesopotamia under the self-governance of an Assyrian state.

The tumultuous history of the traditional Assyrian homeland and surrounding regions, as well as the Partition of the Ottoman Empire, led to the emergence of modern Assyrian nationalism. To this respect, Assyrian independence movement is a "catch-all" term of the collective efforts of proponents of Assyrian nationalism in the context of the modern nation state. As a result of genocide and war, the Assyrians were reduced to a minority population in their indigenous homeland, resulting in political autonomy being unattainable due to the security risks, and the rise of the movement for Assyrian independence as it exists today.

The territory that forms the Assyrian homeland is, similarly to the rest of Mesopotamia, currently divided between present-day Iraq, Turkey, Iran, and Syria. The efforts are specifically in the regions where larger concentrations still exist, and not the Assyrian homeland in its entirety, those regions with large concentrations being Erbil, and the Duhok Governorate in Iraq, the latter two being located in the Iraqi Kurdistan region and the Al-Hasakah Governorate in Syria. Mosul and the Nineveh Governorate had a sizable Assyrian presence prior to the takeover and forced expulsion of the Assyrian population by the Islamic State in 2014.

In his 53 years as Patriarch of the Assyrian Church of the East, Mar Eshai Shimun XXIII petitioned the League of Nations, and then the United Nations for an Assyrian Homeland before stepping down as Patriarch in 1973. The assassination of Mar Eshai Shimun XXIII in 1975 was a demoralizing moment to Assyrian freedom fighters, as he was a significant spiritual and temporal leader.

The independence movement is active both within the homeland and throughout the global diaspora, with much resistance from the local Middle Eastern states and regions, as well as the Kurdish. The movement has spanned centuries, with the initial conceptualization of modern Assyrian statehood occurring in the 19th century with the waning of the Ottoman Empire and rise of European control of the region, notably by the British and Russian Empires, as well as the French Republic.

There have been many hindrances to the movement, including events such as the Assyrian genocide, Simele massacre, internal conflicts over naming disputes and Assyrian churches, portrayals in media, and Arabization, Kurdification, and Turkification policies. Most recently, the primary problem for them has been ISIS, which took over and expelled a massive portion of the population from the Nineveh Plains in Northern Iraq. The Assyrian Aid Society of America has requested that the U.S. government designate these actions as a genocide against Assyrians in these regions.

Austen Henry Layard, the British Empire's ambassador to the Ottoman Empire in the nineteenth century, stated that the Assyrians had survived the Arab, Mongol, and Kurdish conquests in the mountains of Hakkari and northern Mesopotamia, where they had fought to maintain their independence in the nineteenth century.

In 2016, the Iraqi Parliament voted against a new Christian province in Nineveh Plains, which was a stated political objective of all major Assyrian political groups and institutions. Assyrians, including the leader of the Bet-Nahrain Democratic Party, Romeo Hakkari, protested the Iraqi parliament's decision and stated "We do not want to be part of the possible Sunni (Arab) autonomous region in Iraq".

== World War I ==
=== In Turkey ===
Map of the Assyrian genocide • Towns where genocide occurred • Towns that received refugees • Other major cities Regions with Assyrian concentrations

Assyrians primarily lived in the provinces of Hakkari, Şırnak, and Mardin in southeastern Turkey, These areas had sizable Kurdish and Armenian populations. Starting in the nineteenth century, the Armenians, Greeks and Assyrians of eastern Anatolia, including the Hakkari mountains in Van province, were the subject of forced relocations and executions, a possible cause being religious persecution.

The Hakkari region was the main center of Assyrian population in early 20th century. According to the Armenian Patriarch of Constantinople, there were 18,000 Assyrians in Van Vilayet, 15,000 in Bitlis Vilayet and 25,000 in Diyarbekir Vilayet in 1912/1913. In 1914, Young Turks with the aid of the Kurds and other Muslim ethnic groups, began to systemically target the ancient indigenous Christian communities of Asia Minor, primarily composed of Armenians, Assyrians, Greeks and to a small degree Georgians. Events such as the Assyrian genocide, Greek genocide and Armenian genocide followed, as did the similarly motivated Great Famine of Mount Lebanon which targeted Maronite Christians. In the beginning, key Assyrian nationalist leaders and religious figures were wiped out of communities, followed by the systematic massacre and ethnic cleansing by the Turks, Arabs, Kurds, Chechens and Circassians of hundreds of thousands of unarmed men, women and children.

At the outset of World War I, almost one half of the Assyrian population lived in what is today South Eastern Turkey, with the remainder living in what is now Northern Iraq, North Eastern Syria and North Western Iran. The Ottomans planned to join the side of the Central Powers (Germany, the Austro-Hungarian Empire and Bulgaria) and join them in dividing up the British, Russian and French empires in Asia. In 1914, knowing that it was heading into the war, the Ottoman government passed a law that required the conscription of all young males into the Ottoman army to support the war effort. The Ottoman Empire entered World War I in October 1914 by bombarding Russian ports on the Black Sea.

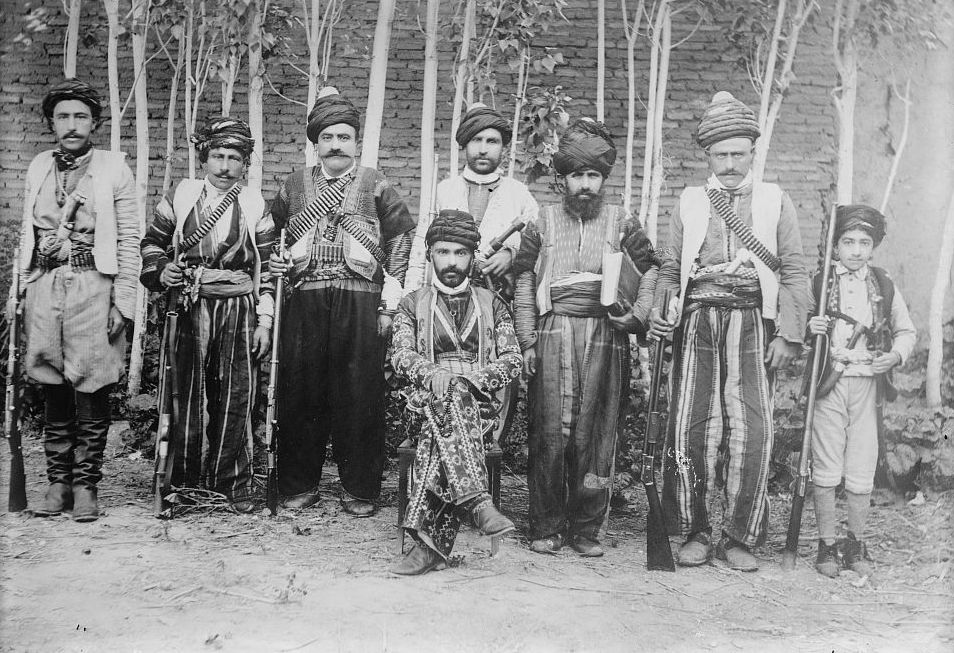
Nestorian archbishop with staff and servants in Persia, early 20th century.

In late 1914 and 1915, the Ottoman Empire under the Young Turk regime declared a holy war on the British, French and Russian Empires. Ottoman Turkish army and allied Kurdish, Turcoman, Circassian and Chechen militias proceeded to massacre tens of thousands of Assyrians in the Hakkari mountains of Kurdistan (upper Mesopotamia, present-day southeastern Turkey) due to Russia's massacres and hostilities towards Muslim populations in northern Iran (including but not limited to Azeris, Turkmen, and Iranians) in 1911 and onwards.

Following the unprovoked massacres of tens of thousands of unarmed Assyrian civilians by the Ottoman Turkish Army and their allies, the Patriarch of the Assyrians, Mar Shimun XIX Benjamin, declared war on the Ottomans on behalf of the Assyrian nation. The Assyrian army under General Dawid, the patriarch's brother, led the Assyrians in a successful breaking of an encircling Ottoman army maneuver, and across the Persian border onto the plains of Urmia.

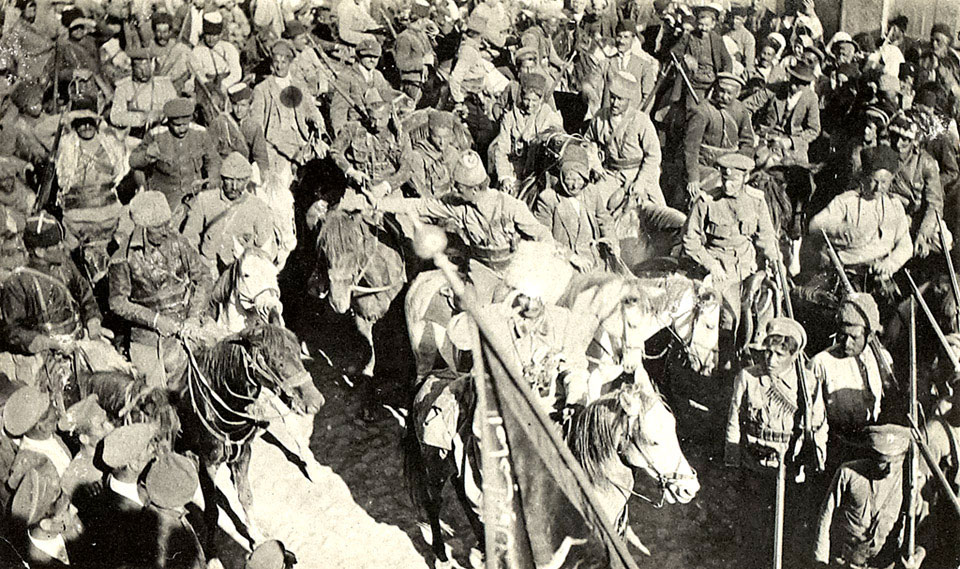
Assyrian troops led by Agha Petros (saluting) with a captured Turkish banner in the foreground, 1918

==== Assyrian volunteers ====
In April 1915 the Assyrian nation, led by its main tribal chiefs of Bit-Jilu, Bit-Bazi, Bit-Tyari, Bit-Tkhuma, Bit-Shamasha, Bit-Eshtazin, Bit-Nochiya and Bit-Diz "took arms against the Turks at the request of the Russians and British." Over the summer of 1915 they successfully held off the far larger Ottoman army and 10,000 Turkish militia and tribal forces fighting with the Ottomans. The Ottomans, unable to break the Assyrians, then brought in heavy artillery and ammunition that, together with an overwhelming advantage in numbers and supplies, eventually overwhelmed the lightly armed and outnumbered Assyrians.

The Russian Army Corps had promised reinforcements, which came too late, leading most of the population of the tribes and districts of Jilu, Baz, Tyari, Tkhuma, Tergawar, Mergawar, Bohtan, Barwari, Amadia and Seert to be massacred, including women, children and the elderly. Churches and monasteries were destroyed or converted into Mosques, livestock and possessions were stolen by the Turks and Turkmens, who then occupied the emptied Assyrian towns, villages and farmsteads.

Survivors of fighting age joined the Assyrians of northwest Persia, northern Iraq and northeast Syria, including those from Salamas and Urmia to form an Assyrian army, and had a real prospect of fighting with the Russians to evict the Ottoman forces from Persia, and historic Assyria. The Assyrians, under such leaders as Agha Petros and Malik Khoshaba, scored a number of victories over the Ottoman and Turkmen forces despite overwhelming odds during this period, until the Russian Revolution of 1917 dissolved the Russian army.

Lacking allies except the British some miles away in Mesopotamia, the Assyrians planned to follow the Russian lines to the Caucasus, but the Allies (including British, French, and Russian diplomats) urged Mar Shimoun and the Assyrian army to defend the Allied-Ottoman front lines, and enjoy autonomy and independence in the post-war period as their reward.

An Assyrian nation under British and Russian protection was promised the Assyrians first by Russian officers, and later confirmed by Captain Gracey of the British Intelligence Service over indigenous Kurdish land. Based on these representations, the Assyrians of Hakkari, under their Mar Shimun XIX Benjamin and the Assyrian tribal chiefs "decided to side with the Allies, first with Christian Russia, and next with the British, in the hope that they might secure after the victory, a self-government for the Assyrians." The French also joined the alliance with the Assyrians, offering them 20,000 rifles. The Assyrian army grew to 20,000 men co-led by Agha Petrus Elia of the Bit-Bazi tribe, and Malik Khoshaba of the Bit-Tiyari tribe, according to Joseph Naayem, a key witness, whose account on the atrocities was prefaced by Lord James Bryce.

==== Assyrian resistance in Tur Abdin ====
The Assyrian Syriac Christians of Diyarbekir Vilayet made significant resistance. Their strongest stand was at the villages of Azakh, Iwardo, and Basibrin. For month, Kurdish tribes and Turkish soldiers commanded by Ömer Naci Bey were unable to subdue the mostly Syriac Orthodox and Syriac Catholic Assyrian villagers, who were joined by Armenian and other Assyrian refugees from surrounding villages. The leaders of the Azakh fedayeen swore: "We all have to die sometime, do not die in shame and humiliation", and lived up to their fighting words.

Also in April, Turkmen and Turkish troops surrounded the village of Tel Mozilt and imprisoned 475 men, among them, Reverend Gabrial, the famous red-bearded priest. The following morning, the prisoners were taken out in rows of four and shot. Arguments rose between the Arabs and the Ottoman officials on what to do with the women and orphans left behind. At about this time, in Seert the Turks and Arabs "assembled all the children of from six to fifteen years and carried them off to the headquarters of the police. There they carried out mass infanticide, leading the children to the top of a mountain known as Ras-el Hadjar and cut their throats one by one, throwing their bodies into an abyss.

In October 1914, 71 Assyrian rebels males of Gawar were arrested and taken to the local government centre in Bashkale and killed in cold blood.

In April 1915, Ottoman Troops invaded Gawar, a region of Hakkari, and massacred the entire population.

In late 1915, Cevdet Bey, Military Governor of Van Province, upon entering Siirt (or Seert) with 8,000 soldiers whom he himself ordered the massacre of almost 20,000 Assyrian civilians in at least 30 villages. Cevdet is reported to have held a meeting in February 1915 at which he said, "We have cleansed the Armenian and Assyrian Christians from Azerbaijan, and we will do the same in Van". The following is a list documenting the villages that were attacked by Cevdet's soldiers and the estimated number of Assyrian deaths:

- Ain-Dare – 200
- Archkanes – 500
- Artoull (Altahtanie) – 500
- Artoun (Alfokanie) – 1000
- Bekend – 500
- Benkof – 200
- Berke – 500
- Charnakh – 200
- Dehok – 500
- Der-Chemch – 200
- Der-Mar-Yacoub – 500
- Der-Maze-n – 300
- Derr-Rabban – 300
- Galwaye – 500
- Goredi – SW
- Guedianes – 500
- Hadide – 1000
- Hartevena – 200
- Ketmes – 1000
- Mar-Chmoune – 300
- Mar-Gourya – 1000
- Piros – 1000
- Redwan – 500
- Sadagh – 2000
- Sairt – 2000
- Tellimchar – 1500
- Telnevro – 500
- Tentas – 500

The village of Sairt/Seert, was populated by Assyrians and Armenians. Seert was the seat of an Assyrian Archbishop of the Chaldean Catholic Church, the Assyrian orientalist Addai Scher who was helped by local Kurds to flee but was eventually murdered by Ottoman soldiers. On March 3, 1918, the Ottoman army led by Kurdish chieftain Simko Shikak, assassinated Mar Shimun XIX Benyamin, one of the Assyrians leaders at that time. The Assyrian leader Malik Khoshaba attacked Simko and sacked his citadel in revenge, however the Kurdish chieftain himself managed to flee. The issue between the two in this case was a proxy war between Iran and Russia.

The Assyrian National Council stated in a December 4, 1922, memorandum that the total death toll was unknown, but it estimated that about 275,000 Assyrians died between 1914 and 1918. The Times of London was perhaps the first widely respected publication to document the fact that 250,000 Assyrians eventually died in the Ottoman genocide of Christians, a figure which many journalists and scholars have subsequently accepted.... As the Earl of Listowel, speaking in the House of Lords on 28 November 1933, stated, the Assyrians fought on our side during the war, and made enormous sacrifices, having lost altogether by the end of the War about two-thirds of their total number..... About half of the Assyrian nation died of murder, disease, or exposure as refugees during the war, according to the head of the Anglican Church, which had a mission to the Assyrians.

Scholars have placed the number of Assyrian victims at 250,000 to 500,000.

Contemporary sources usually speak of the events in terms of an Assyrian genocide, along with the Armenian genocide, Greek genocide and Great Famine of Mount Lebanon by the Ottoman Empire. For example, the International Association of Genocide Scholars reached a consensus that "the Ottoman campaign against Christian minorities of the Empire between 1914 and 1923 constituted a genocide against Armenians, Assyrians, Pontian and Anatolian Greeks and Maronites." After this resolution, the Dictionary of Genocide co-authored by eminent genocide scholar Samuel Totten, an expert on Holocaust education and the genocide in Darfur, contained an entry on the "Assyrian genocide".[18] The president of Genocide Watch, Gregory Stanton, endorsed the "repudiation by the world's leading genocide scholars of the Turkish government's ninety year denial of the Ottoman Empire's genocides against its Christian populations, including Assyrians, Greeks, and Armenians."

The death toll of the Assyrian genocide in Turkey alone was approximately 250,000, according to contemporary and more recent sources. "In 1918, according to the Los Angeles Times, Ambassador Morgenthau confirmed that the Ottoman Empire had 'massacred fully 2,000,000 men, women, and children – Greeks, Assyrians, Armenians; fully 1,500,000 Armenians.' " With 250,000 Greeks among the dead, that makes Ambassador Morgenthau's estimate of Assyrian deaths about 250,000. The Assyro-Chaldean National Council stated in a December 4, 1922, memorandum that the total death toll is unknown, but it estimates that about 275,000 Assyrians died between 1914 and 1918.

==== Assyrian rebellion ====
The Assyrian rebellion was an uprising by the Assyrians in Hakkari that began on the 3rd of September 1924 and ended on the 28th of September. The Assyrians of Tyari and Tkhuma returned to their ancestral land in Hakkari in 1922, shortly after World War I without permission from the Turkish government. This led to clashes between the Assyrians and the Turkish army with their Arab allies that grew into a rebellion in 1924, it ended with the Assyrians being forced to retreat to Iraq.

=== In Persia ===
The Ottoman forces threatened Urmia and northwestern Persia after the Russian Revolution (1917) in October 1917. The Assyrians, led by Assyrian general Agha Petros held them off until June 1918, however their Armenian allies resistance broke and vastly outnumbered, out gunned and cut off from lines of supply, they were again encircled and had no choice but to break through the Ottoman forces to their British allies across the border in Mesopotamia. Up to 100,000 Assyrians left Persia in 1918, but around half died of Turkish, Kurdish and Arab massacres and related outbreaks of starvation and disease. About 80 percent of Assyrian clergy and spiritual leaders had perished, threatening the nation's ability to survive as a unit.

Hannibal Travis, assistant professor of law at Florida International University, wrote in the peer-reviewed journal Genocide Studies and Prevention that the Assyrian city of Urmia was "completely wiped out, the inhabitants massacred," with 200 surrounding villages ravaged, 200,000 of Assyrian dead, and hundreds of thousands more Assyrians starving to death in exile from their agricultural lands. The Associated Press reported that in the vicinity of Urmia, Turkish regular troops and Kurds are persecuting and massacring Assyrian Christians. The victims included 800 massacred near Urmia, and 2,000 dead from disease.

Two hundred Assyrians were burned to death inside a church. The Russians discovered more than 700 bodies of massacre victims in the village of Hafdewan outside Urmia, mostly naked and mutilated, some with gunshot wounds, others decapitated, and still others carved to pieces. Other leading British and American newspapers corroborated these accounts of the Assyrian genocide. The New York Times reported on 11 October that 12,000 Assyrian Christians had died of massacre, hunger, or disease; thousands of girls as young as seven had been raped in sex attacks, or forcibly converted to Islam; Christian villages had been destroyed, and three-fourths of these Christian villages were burned to the ground.

=== In Iraq ===
In Iraq, the Assyrians joined the Kurds and Arabs in celebrating the Ottoman defeat, and joining the levies of the British Mandate of Mesopotamia. Up to 1921 the Levies had consisted of Arabs, Kurds, Turkomans. Now that an Iraqi Army was to be formed, the Arabs would be required to join it rather than to go to Levies. It was decided to enlist Assyrians in the Levies.

In July 1922, orders were issued in which no more Arabs were to be enlisted, as they were required to join the new Iraqi Army, those serving could not re-engage, A 1922 Treaty between Great Britain and Iraq allowed for the continued existence of the Levies as "local forces of the Imperial garrison" and that its members were "members of the British Forces who are inhabitants of Iraq". By 1923 the ethnic composition of the Iraq Levies was half Assyrian and half Kurd, plus an attached battalion of Marsh Arabs and a few Turkomans. The original Levies were not Assyrians until 1928 when the Levies became entirely Assyrian.

As a high British official in Mesopotamia wrote in 1933: "As they became more disciplined they rendered excellent service; during the Arab rebellion of 1920 they displayed, under conditions of the greatest trial, steadfast loyalty to their British officers."

In 1931 Assyrian Levies and Iraqi Army units were patrolling Barzan district. Government troops implied government control, which Shaykh Ahmad still wanted to avoid.

On October 23, 1931, the Catholicos of the Church of the East, Mar Shimun XXI Eshai, and the maliks of the Jilu, Baz, Tkhuma, and Upper Tiyari tribes wrote to the Chairman of the Mandates Commission of the League of Nations to request resettlement out of Iraq, to French Syria or any other country in the League that would accept them as refugees. The Patriarch wrote that: "The Assyrian Nation which is temporarily living in Iraq, ... have unanimously held a Conference with me in Mosul on the 20th October 1931. At this Conference were present the temporal and spiritual leaders of the Assyrian Nation in its entirely as it will be observed from the document quoted above bearing the leaders' signatures." He goes on to say that at the conference, "it was unanimously decided by all those present that it is quite impossible for us to live in Iraq."

He added that "together with the undermentioned signatories being the responsible leaders of the Assyrian Nation" wanted to inform the League that the Assyrians, "which in past centuries numbered millions but reduced to a very small number due to repeated persecutions and massacres that faced us, ... have been able to preserve our Language and Faith up to the present time." He concludes that "WE ARE POSITIVELY SURE THAT IF WE REMAIN IN IRAQ, we shall be exterminated in the course of few years."

On June 1, 1932, the Assyrian Levies presented a signed memorial to their commanding officer stating that "all the men had decided to cease serving as from 1st July." The reason was Britain had "failed adequately to ensure the future of the Assyrian nation after the termination of their mandate over Iraq."

They had dug trenches and were determined on destroying the Assyrians and taking their properties and possessions. Assyrians painfully remembered the massacre of 1933 in Simele and the surrounding villages and pledged "Never Again!". They remembered the raping and pillaging of defenseless Assyrian villagers.

In early 1933, the American representative in Iraq, Paul Knabenshue, described public animosity towards the Assyrians as reaching a 'fever' pitch. With Iraq's independence, the new Assyrian spiritual-temporal leader, Shimun XXI Eshai, demanded that the Assyrians be given autonomy within Iraq, seeking support from Britain. He pressed his case before the League of Nations in 1932. His followers planned to resign from the Assyrian Levies (a levy under the command of the British, serving British interests), and to re-group as a militia and concentrate in the north, creating a de facto Assyrian enclave. In June 1933, the Patriarch was invited to Baghdad for negotiations with Hikmat Sulayman's government and was detained there after refusing to relinquish temporal authority. Mar Shimun would eventually be exiled to Cyprus, thus forcing the head of the Assyrian Church of the East to be located in Chicago up until 2015, when it was moved to Erbil.

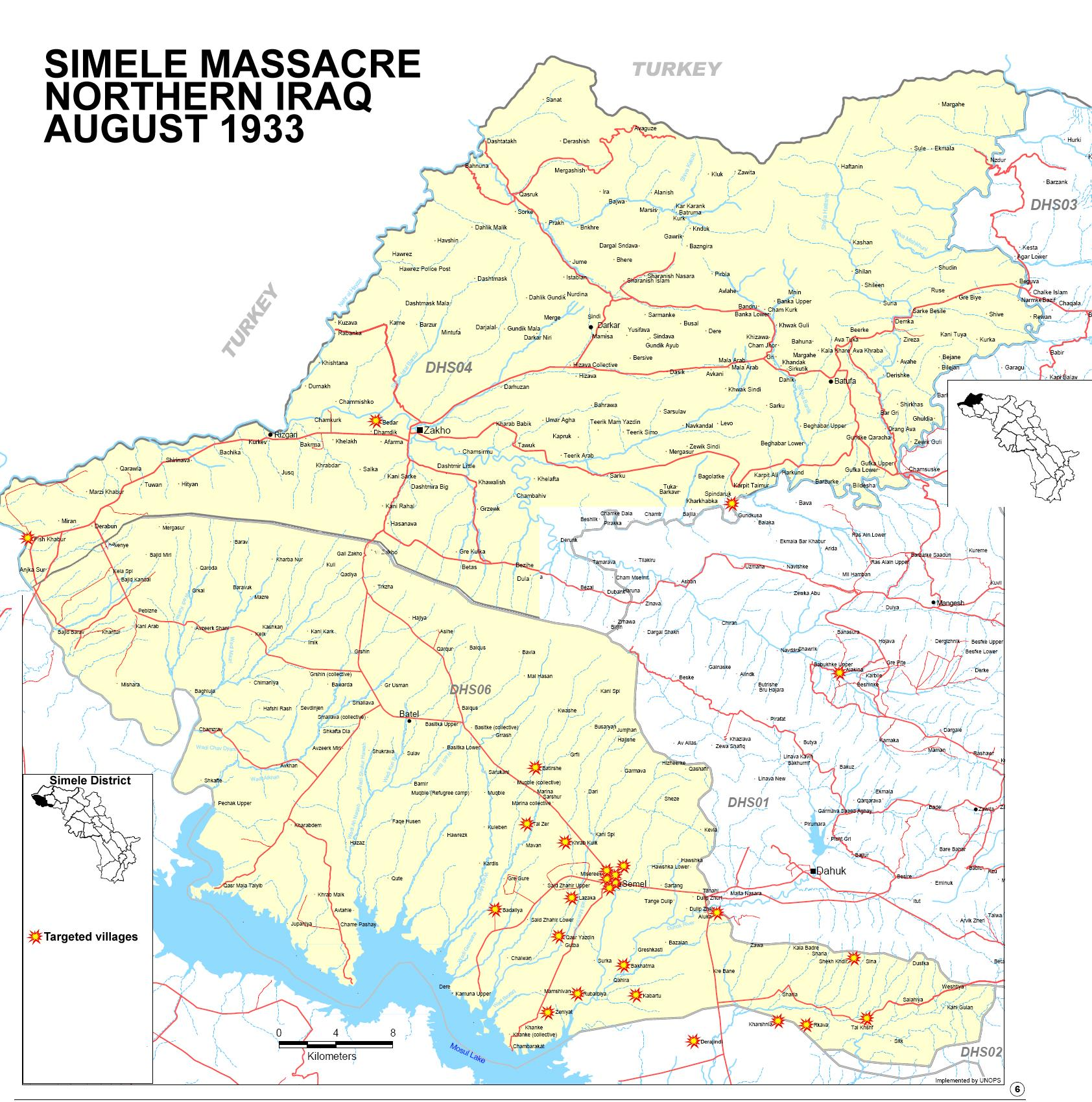
The targeted villages in the Simele and Zakho districts

In early August 1933, the chiefs of the Tkhuma Tribe and the Tiyari led more than 1,000 Assyrians who had been refused asylum in Syria in crossing the border to return to their villages in Northern Iraq, where their wives and children had remained. The French, who at the time were controlling Syria, had notified the Iraqis that the Assyrians were not armed; but while the Iraqi soldiers were disarming those whose arms had been returned, shots were fired resulting in 30 Iraqi and Assyrian casualties. Anti-Assyrian and Anti-British xenophobia, apparent throughout the crisis, accelerated.

Reports circulated of Assyrian mutilation of Iraqi soldiers, later proven to be false. In Baghdad, the government panicked, fearing disaster as the Assyrians presented a formidable fighting force that could provoke a general uprising in the north. The government unleashed Kurdish irregulars who killed some 120 inhabitants of two Assyrian villages in the week of August 2 to August 9 (with most of the massacre occurring on August 7). Then on August 11, Kurdish general Bakr Sidqi (who had clashed with Assyrians before) led a march to what was then one of the most heavily inhabited Assyrian area in Iraq, the Simele district.

The Assyrian population of the district of Simele was indiscriminately massacred; men women, and children. In one room alone, eighty one Assyrians of Baz tribe were massacred. Religious leaders were prime targets; eight Assyrian priests were killed during the massacre, including one beheaded and another burned alive. Girls were raped and women violated and made to march naked before the Muslim army commanders. Holy books were used as fuel for burning girls. Children were run over by military cars. Pregnant women were bayoneted. Children were flung in the air and pierced with bayonets.

Back in the city of Nohadra, 600 Assyrians were killed by Sidqi's men.

In the end, around 65 Assyrian villages were targeted in the Mosul and Dohuk districts.

The Semele or Simele massacre was the systematic targeting of Assyrians of Northern Iraq in August 1933. This included not only the massacre of Simele, but also the killing spree that continued among 63 Assyrian villages in the Dohuk and Mosul districts that led to the deaths of an estimated 3,000 innocent Assyrians.

The Simele massacre of the Assyrian people is often regarded as a phase of the Assyrian genocide beginning in August 1914 in the early days of what became World War I.

List of targeted villages
Ala Keena	Bameri	Betershy	Dairke	Gond Naze	Kaserezden	Korekavana	Majel Makhte	Sirchuri
Aloka	Barcawra	Betafrey	Dair Kishnik	Harkonda	Kerry	Kowashey	Rabibyia	Shekhidra
Badalliya	Baroshkey	Bidari	Derjendy	Idleb	Kitba	Lazga	Rekawa	Spendarook
Baderden	Basorik	Biswaya	Fishkhabour	Kaberto	Khalata	Mansouriya	Sar Shorey	Tal Zet
Bagerey	Bastikey	Carbeli	Garvaly	Karpel	Kharab Koli	Mawani	Sezary	Tel Khish
Bakhitmey	Benaringee	Chem Jehaney	Gereban	Karshen	Kharsheniya	Qasr Yazdin	Sidzari	Zeniyat

Today, most of these villages are inhabited by Kurds. The main campaign lasted until August 16, but violent raids on Assyrians were being reported up to the end of the month. After the campaign, Badr Sidqi was invited to Baghdad for a victory rally. The campaign resulted in one third of the Assyrian population of Iraq fleeing to Syria.

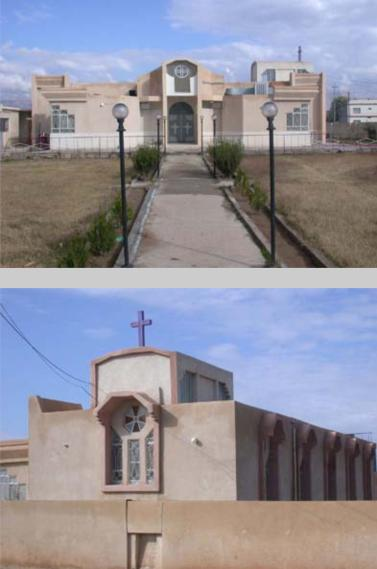
Church Of Martyrs - named after the massacre stands today in the town of Simele.

Assyrian fighter from the Tyari tribe, during the 1890s.

Immediately after the massacre and the shutting down of the Assyrian uprising, the Iraqi government demanded a conscription bill. Non-Assyrian Iraqi tribesmen offered to serve in the Iraqi army, to counter the Assyrians. In late August, the government of Mosul demanded that the central government 'ruthlessly' stamp out the rebellion, and that it eliminate all foreign influence in Iraqi affairs, and that the government take immediate steps to enact a law for compulsory military service.

The next week, 49 Kurdish tribal chieftains joined in a pro-conscription telegram to the government, expressing thanks for punishing the 'Assyrian insurgents', stating that a "nation can be proud of itself only through its power, and since evidence of this power is the army," they requested compulsory military service. Rashid Ali presented the bill to the parliament. His government fell before it was legislated and Jamil Midfai's government enacted conscription in January 1934.

The massacre would eventually lead to 15,000 Assyrians leaving the Nineveh Plains for neighboring French Mandate of Syria, and create 35 new villages on the banks of the Khabur River.

Raphael Lemkin, who coined the term genocide, was directly influenced by the story of this massacre. The Simele massacre inspired Lemkin to create the concept of "Genocide". In 1933, Lemkin made a presentation to the Legal Council of the League of Nations conference on international criminal law in Madrid, for which he prepared an essay on the Crime of Barbarity as a crime against international law. The concept of the crime, which later evolved into the idea of genocide, was based the Simele massacre, the Armenian genocide and the Jewish Holocaust.

=== Conferences and treaties ===
After siding with the Allies of World War I, the Assyrians were promised an independent state of their own. This promise was not kept.

==== Paris Peace Conference, 1919 ====
In 1919, the Syriac Orthodox Bishop Afram I Barsoum (later Patriarch of Antioch) wrote a letter on behalf of the Assyrians to the League of Nations. (Note: See the original letter Archived 2015-09-23 at the Wayback Machine and a revised clearer version Archived 2015-09-23 at the Wayback Machine)

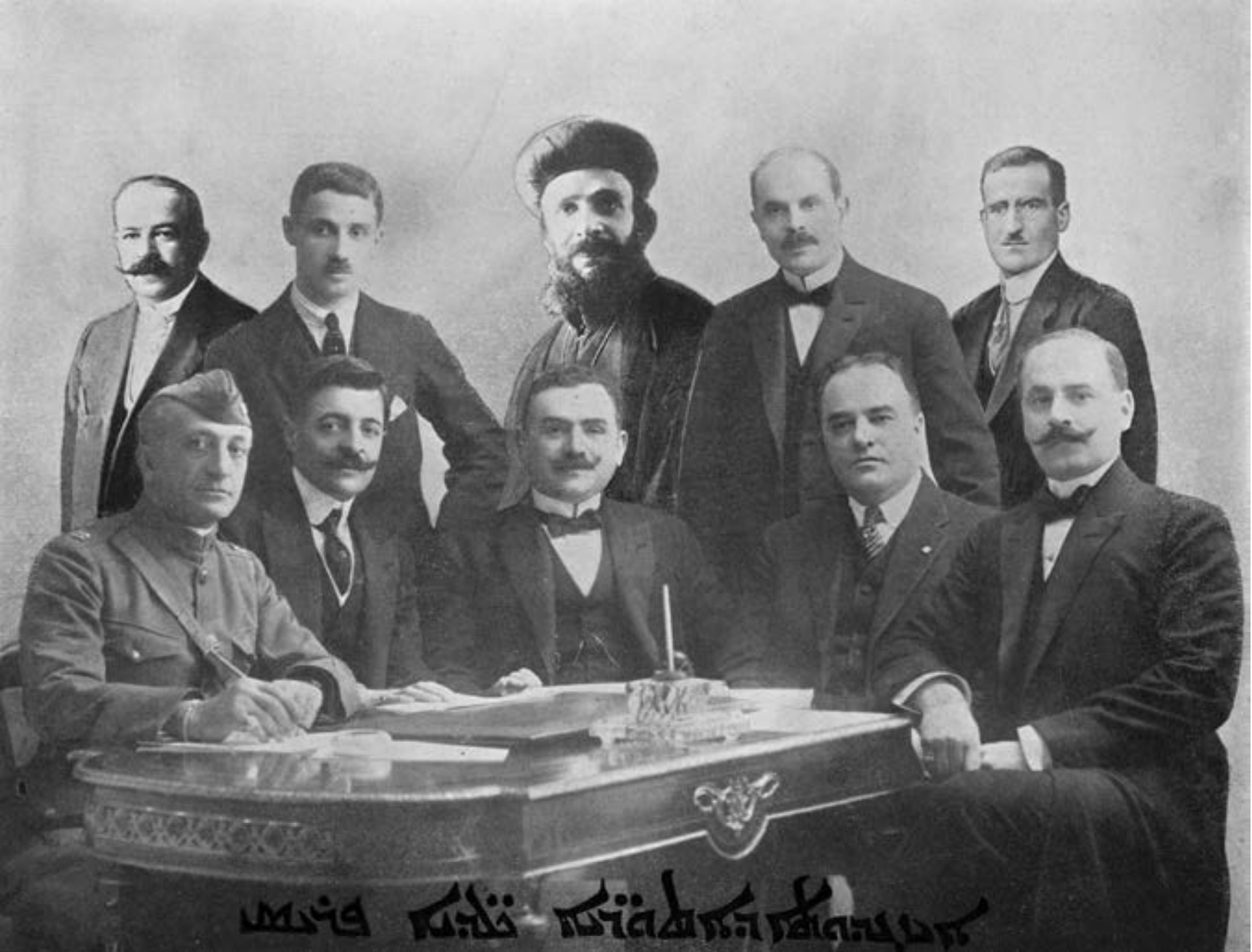
Assyro-Chaldean delegation to the Paris Peace Conference

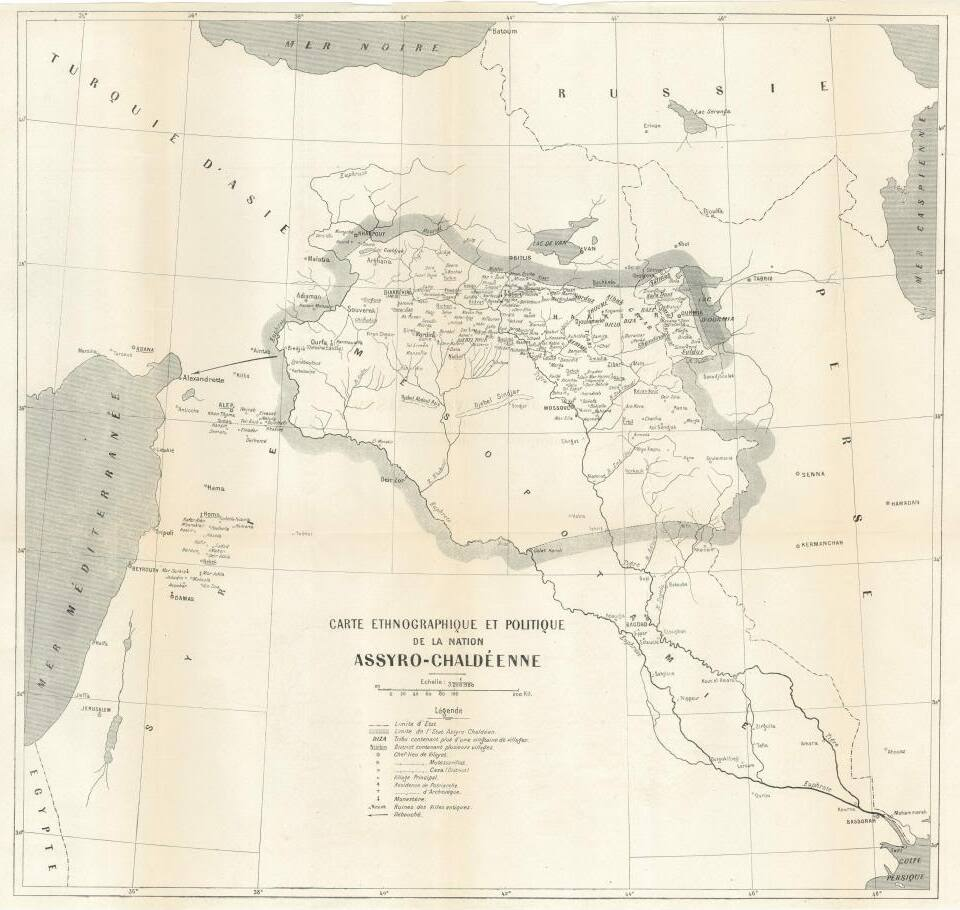
The Assyrian delegation's map of an independent Assyria, presented at the Paris Peace Conference, 1919

In the letter the bishop wrote that 180,000 Assyrians had been massacred by the Turks. He also said that the Assyrian people were against the proposed autonomy of the Kurds. The letter convinced France to allow Assyrian representation during the upcoming peace conference.

Three Assyrian groups were scheduled to participate in the Peace Conference: Assyrian delegates from the United States, Iraq and Iran.

The Assyrian group from Iran arrived in France first. The British, having no authority in Iran and fearing the presence of a group which it could not control, forced the Iranian Assyrian delegation to leave Paris and not participate.

Then the Assyrian delegates from the United States arrived. Their demands included the establishment of an Assyrian independent territory which would include Northern Beth Nahrain, beginning at the Little Zab Diyar Bakir and extending to the Armenian mountains, and that the territory would be under the protection of the great powers.

U.S. delegate Rev. Joel E. Werda in his petition concluded;

We have the most conclusive proofs to show that the Assyrians were urged by the official representatives of Great Britain, France and Russia, to enter into the war on the side of the Allies ... with the most solemn promises of being given a free state. The Assyrians, therefore, having risked the very existence of their nation, and having made such appalling sacrifices upon the altar of freedom, demand that these promises of the Allied governments now be honorably redeemed.

Great Britain and the U.S. delegates denied this petition, explaining that the U.S. President Woodrow Wilson had strong reservations concerning any plans to divide Turkey. The American Assyrian delegation returned from the conference empty handed.

The Assyrian delegates from Iraq, after many delays by the British authorities, were approved to travel to Paris on July 21 on one condition: that they pass through London, England first. Surma Khanim, the head of the delegation was kept in London until the conference of France finished its deliberations. His demands had been to allow the Assyrians to return to Hakkâri, that they be accorded equal rights, that all Assyrian prisoners be released, and that the individuals responsible for the atrocities committed against the Assyrians be punished.

==== Treaty of Sèvres, 1920 ====
The Treaty of Sèvres, signed on August 10, 1920, between the Allies and Turkey, laid the foundations for the new Turkish frontier after World War I. Assyrians were not permitted by Great Britain to participate in these deliberations under the rule that the Assyrians were not an equal power with the rest of the participants. However, the Assyrian issue was discussed and the plan was to contain full safeguards for the protection of the Assyro-Chaldeans and other racial or religious minorities under articles 62, 63, 140, 141, 142, 147, 148, 149, and 150. As a result of this treaty, Mosul (Nineveh) was given to Iraq while France was guaranteed 25% of Mosul's oil production.

Article 62 of the Treaty states:

... this plan must provide complete guarantees as to the protection of the Assyro-Chaldeans and other ethnic or religious minorities in this area. To this end, a commission made up of British, French, Italian, Persian and Kurdish representatives will visit the area so as to determine what adjustments, if any, should be made to the Turkish frontier wherever it coincides with [the] Persian frontier as laid down in this treaty.

==== Treaty of Lausanne, 1923 ====
The Treaty of Lausanne, signed on July 24, 1923, between the Allied powers and Turkey, was composed after Turkey requested that the issue of Mosul (Nineveh) be re-examined. Assyrians once again were not allowed to participate as Great Britain interfered, but they were promised again that their rights would be protected. It is worth mentioning that Agha Petros, General of the Assyrian Army, attended the opening ceremonies. The United States stood with Great Britain in these deliberations, the latter promising 20% of the oil industry business be awarded to American companies. Turkey lost its appeal to win Mosul back based on Great Britain's claims that the region would be saved for the future settlement of the Kurdish and Assyrian people, but no final agreement was reached.

Article 39 of the treaty states:

There will be no official restriction on any Turkish citizen's right to use any language he wishes, whether in private, in commercial dealings, in matter of religion, in print or at a public gathering. Regardless of the existence of an official language, appropriate facilities will be provided for any non-Turkish-speaking citizen of Turkey to use his own language before the court.

==== Constantinople Conference, 1924 ====
The Constantinople Conference was between Great Britain and Turkey, May 21, 1924. The Assyrians were told that Britain was "fighting" their case for them and that there was no need for them to attend. A letter on behalf of the Assyrians and their settlement was written under the direction of Sir Henry Conway Dobbs, the British High Commissioner in Iraq, under "Statement of Proposals for the Settlement of the Assyrian People in Iraq", in that regard.

The government of Turkey claimed Mosul as part of Turkey, and Fet'hi Beg declared that the Assyrians, whom he referred to as Nestorians, are welcome to live in their previous lands in Turkey where they would find freedom. Sir Percy Cox stated that Mosul belonged to Iraq and that the Christian Assyrians needed protection from Turkey.

This was part of his statement:

...His Majesty's Government has decided to endeavor to secure a good treaty frontier, which will at the same time admit of the establishment of the Assyrians in a compact community within the limits of the territory in respect of which His Majesty's Government hold a mandate under the authority of the League of Nations, if not in every case in their ancestral habitation, at all events in suitable adjacent districts. This policy for the settlement of the Assyrians has the full sympathy and support of the Iraqi Government, which is prepared for its part, to give the necessary cooperation for giving effect thereto.

Ultimately, no agreement was reached. Turkey then massed its troops on the border to occupy the Mosul Province by force. The Assyrian Levy Force of 2,000 was sent north to protect Iraq since the Iraqi army at this time was unfit to undertake such a task. The Assyrian force was largely responsible for the annexation of Mosul to Iraq rather than to Turkey, as an official of the League of Nations stated.

== Interwar period (1925–39) ==
=== Recommendation of the League of Nations ===
On June 16, 1925, the Commission presented its findings. It recommended that the Assyrian people receive full protection if they were to return to Turkey, that they be given their freedom, and that they receive reimbursements for all their losses during World War I. The Commission further recommended the Patriarch, Mar Eshai Shimun XXIII, be given full authority over his people.

These recommendations were not approved. It was finally decided that the issue be referred to the Permanent Court of International Justice in The Hague, an integral part of the charter of the League of Nations. This court was later replaced by the International Court of Justice after the birth of the United Nations.

==== The Hague September ====
In 1925 the Permanent Court of International Justice took over the disputed border line issue and, in December 1925, adopted a resolution which refused the idea of the Assyrian's return to Hakkâri and gave that region to Turkey, while giving Mosul to Iraq and settling on a border line almost matching the same status quo line which was called the Brussels Line. Further, it recommended the continuation of the British mandate on Iraq for another 25 years to safeguard the Assyrian interests.

==== Assyrian human rights ====
On November 11, 1927, the Assyrians continued to protest their mistreatment and sent letters to the League of Nations, requesting a report from both the governments of Britain and Iraq concerning the situation. The Permanent Court of International Justice in The Hague did not accept the reports of Britain and Iraq and requested that both countries fulfill their obligations towards the Assyrians.

=== British treaties and Assyrian petitions ===
Britain dropped the earlier established recommendations by the Mandate Commission on the grounds that those recommendations should be directed to the Turkish Government and not the Iraqi Government, Assyrians from the Hakkâri and Tur Abdin originally, escaped and have no intentions of returning to Turkey. Hence, they should occupy the land the Iraqi government has provided for them.

Several treaties were signed and ratified between Britain and Iraq in the next two years in what seemed to be Britain's preparations to clear the way for Iraq to enter the League of Nations.

Three petitions were received by the Mandate Commission stressing the fears of the Assyrians regarding the termination of the Mandate; they were dated in September 1931; October 20, 1931; and October 23, 1931. One was rejected by Sir Francis Humphrys on the grounds that it was submitted by a person not qualified to represent the Assyrians. Humphrys still pledged the moral responsibility of Great Britain to the future attitude of the Iraqi government.

The October 23, 1931, petition was submitted by Shimun XXI Eshai, in Mosul, asking for permission to allow the Assyrians to leave Iraq before the end of the Mandate, stating that it would be impossible for the Assyrians to live in Iraq. This decision was reached at with the agreement of all the Assyrian leaders and when responses to this petition were delayed, the Assyrians decided to take action and planned for a general 'cessation of service' by all the Levies.

The Mandate Commission reviewed the Assyrian petition and was still not satisfied with Britain's and Iraq's assurances of protection of minorities. Worth mentioning here that Sir Humphrys was accused by his own fellow British officials to fabricate lies in regards to the Iraqi government's sentiments about the Assyrians.

The Mandate Commission gave its recommendations, stating that they are concerned about the Christians, and accordingly, average people were given the right to submit any petitions to the League of Nations, directly, in the future.

In partial compliance with requests of the petition, the Iraqi government set up a further land-finding committee. It discovered but little land both cultivable and available. In fact, they found malaria-ridden, swampy lands, and recommended expenditure on an irrigation scheme to produce more. Hundreds upon hundreds of Assyrians died with malaria in those lands.

The Council of the League of Nations accepted the recommendations and Iraq issued a declaration guaranteeing the protection of minorities on May 30, 1932.

Accordingly, Iraq was accepted into the League of Nations on October 3, 1932.

=== Massacre of Assyrians in Iraq ===
The Assyrian national question was taken to Geneva by the Assyrian Patriarch Shimun XXI Eshai again when he addressed the Permanent Mandate Commission meeting and urged the council to fulfill its obligations toward the Assyrian Nation. The League yet again granted the Assyrians their rights of homogenous community in Iraq with a local autonomy.

Mar Eshai Shimum was quoted in the meeting:

If the (British) mandate is lifted without effective guarantees for our protection in the future, our extermination would follow.

After the establishment of the Kingdom of Iraq in 1932, an Assyrian uprising followed through the following year, anyone refusing to sign a declaration of loyalty to King Faisal and agreeing not to thwart the scheme of the League of Nations for the settlement of the Assyrians, was deported by the order of the government on August 18, 1933, and deprived of Iraqi nationality.

The failed uprising led to the massacre of 3,000 Assyrians throughout northern Iraq, with the largest massacre taking place in the village of Simele. Eyewitnesses wrote numerous books about the events.

The Levies, alarmed by this and the imminent withdrawal of British troops, decided upon a concentration of all Assyrians in the Amadia area for security. All Assyrian officers jointly presented a manifesto on July 16 to the commanding officer requesting discharge within 30 days. The other ranks also followed the lead of their officers. The British feared if this were allowed to happen they would lose all authority in Iraq. To buy time, they decided to allow discharge over a four-month period. A British battalion was flown in from Egypt when discharges commenced.

After negotiations with Assyrian leaders, the Levies withdrew their request and the British battalion was withdrawn. In all, 296 were discharged. No Iraqi was held responsible for the massacre. A large number of Assyrians began to flee Iraq and find safety in Syria, under French control at the time. The transport and machine gun Assyrian companies ceased to exist as separate units, both being divided between the two Assyrian battalions. Kirkuk was occupied by a platoon from the 2nd battalion to guard the wireless and other RAF stores.

Due to the events of 1933, Assyrians mark August 7 as their martyrs day.

…We're washed up as a race, we're through, it's all over, why should I learn to read the language? We have no writers, we have no news – well, there is a little news: once in a while the English encourage the Arabs to massacre us, that is all. It's an old story, we know all about it.

=== Mar Eshai Shimun in Geneva with Yousuf Malik ===
After the Simele massacre, the Council of the League of Nations was absolutely sure that the Assyrian issue was still an unsolved problem. The Assyrian Patriarch requested the League to form an Assyrian and Kurdish enclave in the north of the province of Mosul under a special administration. The Patriarch reminded the Council about the plan originally suggested by Lord Curzon, the British Foreign Minister, on December 17, 1919.

In Iraq, Rashid Ali al-Kaylani, the Iraqi Prime Minister, announced that the Assyrians should find a new home outside Iraq and promised that the Iraqi government was willing to make very generous contributions to cover any expenses of such settlement. On October 13, 1933, the League of Nations appointed a committee of six of its members to look into this possibility.

On October 24, the Assyrians submitted another petition by Yousuf Malik, an Assyrian Nationalist from Iraq who was exiled to Lebanon and who moved between Cyprus, Beirut and Damascus exposing what was going on inside Iraq and the British games. This petition gives the details of many cases of oppression against the Assyrians in Iraq, details on hardships from government officials, and the facts about the Simele massacre.

From October 1933 to June 1935, the committee of six looked into many options. They covered Brazil, British Guiana, Niger, however, all failed. A further suggestion that the British Red Cross might send a relief party to Mosul was also objected to, apparently on the grounds that this would discourage the activities of the Iraqi Crescent, which has not carried out any relief work among the Assyrians. In September 1935, the plan of settling of some of the Assyrians in the Khabour and Ghab areas in Syria was approved. History shows that the plan was never followed up so it too has failed.

Things did not change for the Assyrians in Iraq until the outbreak of World War II, when the Iraqis revolted under Rashid Ali al-Kaylani who sided himself with Germany and wanted to force the British out of Iraq completely. The faith of the British existence in Iraq hanged in the hands of the 1500 Assyrian Levies' ability to hold the British Air Force Base in Habbaniya against the rebels of over 60,000 Arab tribesmen and regular troops who surrounded the base.

The Battle of Habbaniya is well described in the book, The Golden Carpet by Somerset de Chair, a British intelligence officer serving in Iraq during World War II.

== Assyrian resistance during World War II ==
The British and Soviet Allies used the Iraq Levies, many of whom were Assyrians, to resist German efforts to gain a foothold in West Asia. The Iraq Levies distinguished themselves in May 1941 during the Anglo-Iraqi War.

In the early days of World War II, Rashid Ali al-Gaylani came to power as Prime Minister of Iraq. As one of his first acts, he sent an Iraqi artillery force to confront the RAF base situated in Habbaniya, RAF Habbaniya. By the end of April, the Iraqi armed forces were situated in strong positions on the escarpment above the base and a siege began.

Amin al-Husseini (Arabic: محمد أمين الحسيني 1895/1897 – July 4, 1974), was the choice of the Nazis and Italian fascists to make inroads into the Middle East, including Iraq. A veteran of the Ottoman army, from 1921 to 1948 he was the Grand Mufti of Jerusalem.

As early as 1920, al-Husseini was active in both opposing the British in order to secure the independence of Palestine as an Arab state and opposing Jewish immigration and the establishment of a Jewish national home in Palestine. His oppositional role peaked during the 1936–39 Arab revolt in Palestine. In 1937, wanted by the British, he fled Palestine and took refuge successively in Lebanon, Iraq, Italy and finally Nazi Germany where he met Adolf Hitler in 1941. He asked Germany to oppose, as part of the Arab struggle for independence, the establishment of a Jewish national home in Palestine.

al-Husseini was still in the Kingdom of Iraq when, on 1 April 1941, pro-German Rashid Ali and his pro-German "Golden Square" supporters staged a coup d'etat. The 1941 Iraqi coup d'état caused the pro-British Regent Abdul Ilah to flee and the pro-British Prime Minister Taha al-Hashimi to resign. From his base in Iraq, al-Husseini issued a fatwa for a holy war against Britain in May. Less than days later, the Rashid Ali government collapsed, Regent Abdul Ilah returned, and British troops occupied the country.

Iraq had been a major supplier of petroleum to the Allied war effort and represented an important landbridge between British forces in Egypt and India. To secure Iraq, Prime Minister Winston Churchill ordered General Archibald Wavell to protect the air base at Habbaniya.

During 1940/41 Iraq joined the Axis powers and the Battle of Habbaniya took place. At Habbaniya, the besieging Iraqis demanded the cessation of all training activities and of all flights in and out of the base.

The commander at RAF Habbaniya, Air Vice-Marshal Harry George Smart, responded to the Iraqi demands by launching a pre-emptive strike against the Iraqi forces overlooking the air base. During the Rashid Ali rebellion in 1941 the base was besieged by the Iraqi Army encamped on the overlooking plateau. The subsequent arrival of a relief column (Kingcol), part of Habforce sent from Palestine, then a British mandate, combined with the Habbaniya units to force the rebel forces to retreat to Baghdad. The Levies then recruited an additional 11,000 men, mostly Assyrians but also some Kurd and Yezidi.

The siege was lifted by the units based at Habbaniya, including pilots from the training school, a battalion of the King's Own Royal Regiment flown in at the last moment, Number 1 Armoured Car Company RAF, and the RAF's Iraq Levies. This action initiated the Anglo-Iraqi War. Within a week, the Iraqis abandoned the escarpment. By mid-May, British forces from Habbaniya had moved on to Fallujah and, after overcoming Iraqi resistance there, moved on to Baghdad. On 29 May, fearing a British onslaught, Gaylani fled to Persia. As a result, al-Husseini fled to Persia where he was granted legation asylum first by the Empire of Japan and then by Fascist Italy.

By 1942, the Iraq Levies consisted of a Headquarters, a Depot, Specialist Assyrian companies, 40 service companies and the 1st Parachute Company, which consisted of 75% Assyrian and 25% Kurd. The new Iraq Levies disciplinary code was based largely on the Indian Army Act. The Levies had 22 Assyrian companies, 5 Mixed Assyrian/Yizidi companies, 10 Kurdish companies, 4 Gulf Arab companies and 3 Baluchi companies. Eleven Assyrian companies served in World War II-era Palestine and another four served in Cyprus. The Parachute Company was attached to the Royal Marine Commando and were active in both Albania and Greece. The Iraq Levies was renamed the Royal Air Force Levies.

In 1945 after the Second World War 1945 – the Iraq Levies were reduced to 60 British officers and 1,900 other ranks and the RAF Regiment took over command of the Levies. In 1946 the Iraq Levies battalions were redesignated as Wings and Squadrons to conform to the RAF Regiment procedure.

== After World War II ==
=== Mar Eshai Shimun at the United Nations ===
The United Nations was born in San Francisco (replacing the League of Nations).

The Assyrian Patriarch, Shimun XXI Eshai, was there to present the Assyrian petition to the new world body of peace and was accompanied by two members of the Assyrian National Federation. In this petition the Assyrian tragedy was explained from World War I until the end of World War II.

Several petitions from the Patriarch in 1945 and 1946 were sent to the Secretary-General of the United Nations to look into the Assyrian National Question. A letter from the UN Secretary-General # 1100-1-4/MEJ dated Oct. 7, 1946 was received by Mar Shimun stating that he had referred the Patriarch's petition to the Commission on Human Rights.

=== Petition to the UN Secretary-General about Assyrian Massacres in Iran ===
A petition concerning the Assyrian massacres in Iran was filed again by Shimun XXI Eshai, Patriarch of the Assyrian Church of the East. Mar Eshai struggled for over a half century at the League of Nations, then the United Nations. None of his petitions were taken seriously.

== Assyrians in the Republic of Iraq (1958–2003) ==
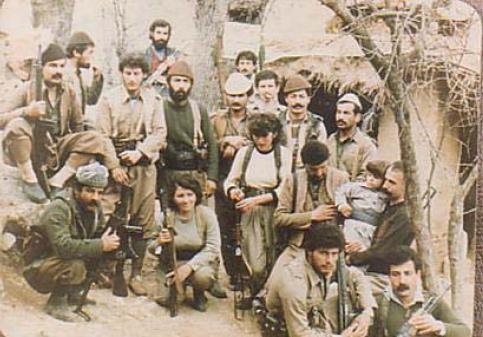
Assyrian militia loyal to the ADM in the 1980s.

Inspired by Gamal Abdel Nasser, officers from the Nineteenth Brigade known as "Free Officers", under the leadership of Brigadier Abdul-Karim Qassem and Colonel Abdul Salam Arif, overthrew the Hashimite monarchy on July 14, 1958.

The overthrow of Iraq's monarchy instilled new hope for the Assyrian cause. However, this hope was short-lived. Qassem was assassinated in February 1963, throwing Iraq into a period of political uncertainty. Out of the chaos emerged the Ba'ath Party who promptly took control of Iraq's government.

The Ba'ath brought promise to Iraq and the Assyrian cause when the new government recognized the cultural rights of Syriac-speaking citizens (Assyrians, Chaldeans and members of the East Syrian Church) in 1972. Syriac was to be the language used at all primary schools where the majority of pupils spoke that language in addition to Arabic. Syriac was also to be taught at intermediate and secondary schools where the majority of students spoke that language in addition to Arabic. Special programs in Syriac were to be broadcast on public radio and television and three Syriac-language magazines were to be published. An association of Syriac-speaking authors and writers was also established.

Still, no autonomy was granted to the Assyrians. However, movements towards autonomy and independence remained active. In 1968, a new Assyrian flag was introduced and adopted by the Assyrian Congress in Tehran. In 1977, the Assyrian Provisional Government, headquartered from the Assyrian diaspora in the United States in Chicago, chartered a constitution for an autonomous Assyrian state. The Assyrians now had their goal set and would maintain it.

When Saddam Hussein rose to power, things began to change for the Assyrians in Iraq. Assyrians were deprived of their cultural and national rights while at the same time the Ba'athist regime tried to co-opt their history. The 1972 proclamation was reversed and Hussein began a strict campaign of Arabization on any non-Arabs in Iraq, including Assyrians as well as other groups such as Kurds, Iraqi Turkmen, and Armenians. During the Iran–Iraq War, many Assyrians were recruited to the armies of both sides. This resulted in Assyrians in Iraq killing Assyrians in Iran. It was estimated that 60,000 Assyrians were killed during the conflict.

When Hussein first assumed power, the Assyrian population in Iraq numbered 2 million to 2.5 million. Due to both persecution by his regime and subsequent emigration to Jordan, Syria, and Lebanon, that number began to decline drastically.

== Post-Ba'thist Iraq (2003–present) ==
With the fall of Saddam Hussein and the 2003 invasion of Iraq, no reliable census figures exist on the Assyrians in Iraq (as they do not for Kurds or Iraqi Turkmen), though the number of Assyrians is estimated to be approximately 800,000.

The Assyrian Democratic Movement (or ADM) was one of the smaller political parties that emerged in the social chaos of the occupation. Its officials say that while members of the ADM also took part in the liberation of the key oil cities of Kirkuk and Mosul in the north, the Assyrians were not invited to join the steering committee that was charged with defining Iraq's future. The ethnic make-up of the Iraq Interim Governing Council briefly (September 2003 – June 2004) guided Iraq after the invasion included a single Assyrian Christian, Younadem Kana, a leader of the Assyrian Democratic Movement and an opponent of Saddam Hussein since 1979.

=== Assyrian Convention Addresses Assyrian Autonomy ===
The panel discussion entitled "Focus on Iraq" on August 30 featured Assyrian politicians and activist from Iraq and the U.S., which was held in Chicago.

Mr. Willis Fautre's (from Human Rights Without Frontiers) model, two overlapping forms of federalism are envisioned. First, the nation would have separate administrative "regions", each with its own parliament; a form of territorial federalism. Each community (Assyrians, Turkmen, Arabs, and Kurds) would also have their own parliament representing their communities throughout the country; a form of community federalism. The community parliament would have full autonomy in religion, culture, schools, agriculture, energy, and protection of monuments.

The unity of the federal government would be guaranteed by a bicameral system with a House of Representatives elected directly by the people and a Senate appointed by the various communities. For legislation affecting linguistic, cultural, or religious rights, both houses of parliament would have to pass the bill. In addition, though, in the community-based Senate, a super-majority (e.g. 2/3) vote would be needed in addition to a simple majority of every represented community. In such a way, each community would enjoy virtual veto power in matters of language, culture, and religion.

The proposal for an Assyrian self-administered zone established in the environs of Mosul, extending to Dohuk in the north and Fesh Khabur to the northwest has gained increasing appeal among Assyrian activists, intellectuals, and political leaders. The current political challenges facing Assyrians in the newly developing Iraq include rising Islamic pressure, gross under representation of Assyrians, and a sometimes callous misrepresentation of Assyrians simply as a Christian minority without reference to the Assyrian political, cultural, and nationalist platform. As Mr. Jatou reflected, the increasing Islamic fervor as well as other challenges in Iraq necessitate the establishment of an administrative area for Assyrians and Yezidis.

=== Current situation ===
The first of the many church bombings that were to come occurred on the morning of August 4, 2003, that left 19 worshippers dead.

As the attacks on Assyrians continue to escalate, with the 20th church bombed and the death toll of the Assyrians climbing in 2004, demands by Assyrian politicians for an autonomous safe haven reached at an all-time high. A meeting took place in the British House of Commons to discuss the subject.

A meeting was organized by the Labour MP Stephen Pound, in conjunction with the Assyrian Democratic Movement and the Jubilee Campaign, a Christian human-rights group. Pound's demands were:

- Support an autonomous administrative region as a safe haven
- Support the infrastructure of the region
- Oppose "the active and passive ethnic cleansing" of "the only indigenous people of Iraq"

Pound argued "the fate of the Chaldo-Assyrians in Iraq will define the socio-political structure of the Middle East."

The then Prime Minister of Iraq, Iyad Allawi, said he was considering the plan, but nothing resulted as he lost his position in the January 2005 elections.

On November 30, 2005, Iraq's Foreign Minister, Hoshiyar Zebari, supported the idea of an Assyrian administrative region by saying "They (Assyrians) are free to organize a province or regional government. It should not be just because we have Kurdistan, but should be organized around an area. If they can do it in three provinces or even one it should and can be done."

In the same weekend, a further five Assyrian churches were bombed in Iraq. By the end of 2004, an estimated 40,000 Assyrians and other Christians had fled Iraq since the beginning of the war.

Australia's Labor Party member Chris Bowen spoke about the possibility of autonomy for the Assyrians numerous times in the Parliament during 2005.

On February 24, 2006, Minister of Human Rights in Kurdistan, Dr. Mohammad Ihsan, stated "We don't mind Iraqi Christians concentrating anywhere they wish, and establishing a new province for themselves in the Nineveh plain, and bringing together Iraqi Christians from all over the world and their return to their houses and towns."

On March 18, 2007, it was reported that Muslims were forcing the Christian Assyrians in the Dora Neighborhood of Baghdad to Pay the jizya, the 'Protection Tax' demanded from Christians and Jews by the Qur'an and Islamic law.

On May 9, 2007, Catholicos Patriarch of the Assyrian Church of the East, Mar Dinkha IV dispatched a letter to President George W. Bush pleading for immediate protection of the Christians of Iraq.

The following week a group of armed Muslims set fire to St. George Assyrian Church in the Dora neighborhood of Baghdad. The group of men poured gasoline on the church and set it on fire. This is the same church that was bombed in the first of a wave of bombings of Assyrian churches. When St. George was bombed in 2004, the church Cross was not damaged; the bombers tore the cross down with their hands after the bombing.

==== European support ====
The National Democrats in Sweden were supporters of ethnopluralism, and support the foundation of an Assyrian state. After visiting the Assyrians in northern Iraq, Dutch Parliament member Joel Voordewind of the Christian Union party asked the Dutch Minister of Foreign Affairs Verhagen to increase the pressure on the Central Government of Baghdad through the European Union in order to execute a plan for an Assyrian police force for the protection of their towns and villages in the Nineveh plains.

==== US Support ====
In September 2016, a bipartisan resolution was introduced into the US House of Representatives to support the creation of a permanent safe haven for persecuted minorities, including Christians, Yazidis, and Shiite Turkmen, that would be centered on the traditional Assyrian homeland in the Nineveh Plain. The legislation was introduced by Rep. Jeff Fortenberry (R-NE), and it had 11 co-sponsors from Democrats and Republicans. It was referred to the House Foreign Affairs Committee.

Organizations that actively lobby the U.S government include: Assyrian American Political Advocacy Committee (AAPAC), Assyrian American National Federation (AANF), Assyrian American National Coalition (AANC), Assyrian Policy Institute.

==== Assyrian Christian Police Force ====
During recent kidnappings and murders of Assyrian Bishops and priests in the North Iraqi region, Assyrians have demonstrated worldwide in the thousands in demanding protection for their villages and the Nineveh Plains region, which Assyrians hope will become an autonomous area under the control of the Assyrians and minorities in the North.

A $4 million measure will fund a 711-man local police force for the Nineveh Plain. It is part of a $30 million emergency relief package for the predominantly Christian region submitted to Congress last month by Rep. Mark Kirk, R-Ill., and Rep. Frank Wolf, R-Va.

In April 2008, the initial complement of 711 policemen were called up and began training. Another 4000 policemen will be needed to fully secure the region and establish checkpoints on all highways and roads leading into the villages.

== See also ==
- Assyrian homeland
- Assyrian genocide
- Simele massacre
- Assyrian nationalism
- Proposals for Assyrian autonomy in Iraq
- Assyrian people
- Assyrian diaspora
- List of Assyrian tribes
- Assyrian flag
- History of the Assyrian people

== Bibliography ==
=== Primary sources ===
- Naayem, Jean (1920). Les Assyro-Chaldeans et les Armeniens Massacres Par les Turcs, documents inédits recueillis par un témoin oculaire published in English as Shall This Nation Die?. Paris/New York: Bloud et Gay/Chaldean Rescue. Archived from the original on 2017-12-18.
- Rhetore, Jacques. 'Les chrétiens aux bêtes'; Souvenirs de la guerre sainte proclamée par les Turcs contre les chrétiens en 1915. Paris: Les editions du Cerf (2004/2005).
- Toynbee, Arnold (1916). Treatment of Armenians and the Assyrian Christians by the Turks, 1915–1916, in the Ottoman Empire and North-West Persia, 3 Class 96, Series II, six files, FO 96*205–210. Foreign Office.
- Yonan, Gabrielle (1989). Ein vergassener Holocaust: Die Vernichtung der christlichen Assyrer in der Turkei. Gottingen: Gesellschaft für bedrohte Volker.
- Ismet Inönü, Cable sent from Ismet Inönü, head of the Turkish delegation in Lausanne, to the Turkish government. Cable No. 353, January 15, 1923. See the original Ottoman text in atour.com Archived 2017-07-24 at the Wayback Machine.

=== Secondary sources ===
- Baumer, Christoph (2006). The Church of the East: An Illustrated History of Assyrian Christianity. London and New York: I.B. Tauris..
- de Courtois, Sébastian (2004). The Forgotten Genocide: The Eastern Christians, the Last Arameans. Piscataway, NJ: Gorgias Press..
- Gaunt, David (2006). Massacres, resistance, protectors: Muslim-Christian relations in Eastern Anatolia During World War I. Gorgias Press. ISBN 1-59333-301-3..
- Griselle, Eugene (1918). Syriens et Chaldéens: Leur Martyre, Leurs Espérances. Paris: Bloud et Gay..
- Malek, Yusuf (1936). The British Betrayal of the Assyrians. Warren Point, NJ: Kimball Press..
- Nisan, Mordechai (1991). Minorities in the Middle East: A History of Struggle and Self-Expression. Jefferson, NC: McFarland & Co. ISBN 9780899505640..
- Shahbaz, Yonan (1918). The Rage of Islam: An Account of the Massacre of Christians by the Turks in Persia. Philadelphia, PA: Roger Williams Press..
- Yohannan, Abraham (1916). The Death of a Nation, or: The Ever Persecuted Nestorians or Assyrian Christians. New York: G.P. Putnam's Sons..
