= Shimun XVII Abraham =

Patriarch of the Church of the East

Mar Shimun XVII Abraham
- Catholicos-Patriarch of the Church of the East
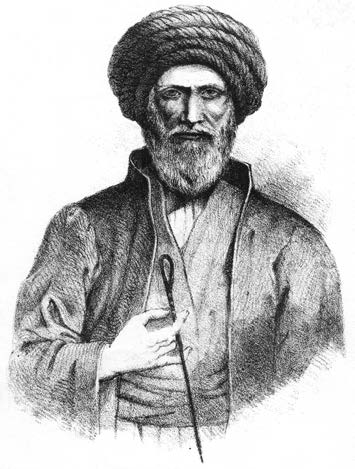
- Church: Assyrian Church of the East
- Diocese: Patriarchal Diocese of Qodshanis
- See: Holy Apostolic See of Seleucia-Ctesiphon
- Installed: 1820
- Term ended: 1861
- Predecessor: Mar Shimun XVI Yohannan
- Successor: Mar Shimun XVIII Rubil

Orders
- Rank: Catholicos-Patriarch

Personal details
- Born: 1800/01 Qodshanis, Hakkari, Ottoman Empire
- Died: 1861 Qodshanis, Hakkari, Ottoman Empire
- Denomination: Christian, Assyrian Church of the East
- Residence: Qodshanis, Hakkari, Ottoman Empire

Mar Shimun XVII Abraham (also Simon XVII Abraham or Auraham, 1800/01– 1861) served as the Patriach of what would eventually be called the Assyrian Church of the East from 1820 to 1861.

He led the church from Qodshanis (modern Konak, Hakkari) in southeastern Turkey, and tried to maintain good relations with local Ottoman authorities. In 1843, he was faced with renewed hostilities from Kurdish warlords, who attacked many Christian villages and killed 10,000 men, taking away women and children as captives, and forcing Patriarch to take refuge in Mosul.

== Sources ==
- Baum, Wilhelm; Winkler, Dietmar W. (2003). The Church of the East: A Concise History. London-New York: Routledge-Curzon. ISBN 9781134430192.
- Baumer, Christoph (2006). The Church of the East: An Illustrated History of Assyrian Christianity. London-New York: Tauris. ISBN 9781845111151.
- Coakley, James F. (1992). The Church of the East and the Church of England: A History of the Archbishop of Canterbury's Assyrian Mission. Oxford: Clarendon Press. ISBN 9780198267447.
- Grant, Asahel (2004). Murre-Van Den Berg, H.L. (ed.). The Nestorians, or, The Lost Tribe. Gorgias Press. p. i. ISBN 1-59333-154-1.
- Guest, John S. (1987). The Yezidis: a study in survival. Routledge. p. 74. ISBN 0-7103-0115-4.
- Murre-Van Den Berg, H.L. (1997). "Geldelijk of Geestelijk Gewin? Assyrische Bisschoppen Op De Loonlijst Van Een Amerikaanse Zendingspost". Nederlands Archief voor Kerkgeschiedenis. 77 (2): 241–257. doi:10.1163/002820397X00270.
- Wilmshurst, David (2000). The Ecclesiastical Organisation of the Church of the East, 1318–1913. Louvain: Peeters Publishers. ISBN 9789042908765.
- Wilmshurst, David (2011). The martyred Church: A History of the Church of the East. London: East & West Publishing Limited. ISBN 9781907318047.

Church of the East titles
Preceded by Mar Shimun XVI Yohannan	Catholicos-Patriarch of the Church of the East; 1820–1861	Succeeded by Mar Shimun XVIII Rubil
