= Shimun XX Paulos =

Mar Shimun XX Paulos
- Catholicos-Patriarch of the Church of the East
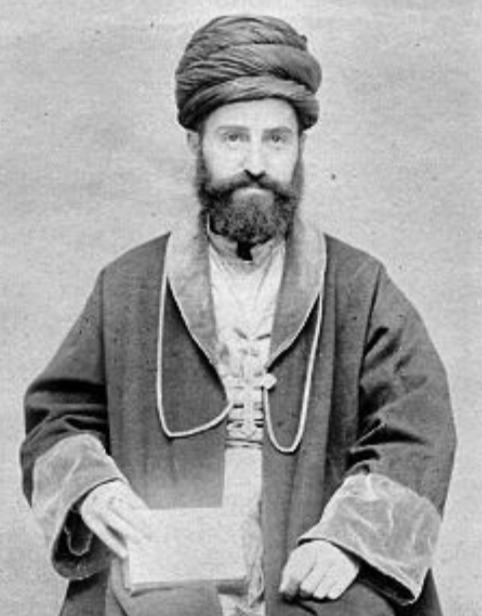
- Mar Shimun XX Paulos in 1920
- Church: Assyrian Church of the East
- Diocese: Patriarchal Diocese of Qodshanis
- See: Holy Apostolic See of Seleucia-Ctesiphon
- Installed: 23 March 1918
- Term ended: 27 April 1920
- Predecessor: Mar Shimun XIX Benyamin (1903-1918)
- Successor: Mar Shimun XXIII Eshai (1920–1975)

Orders
- Rank: Catholicos-Patriarch

Personal details
- Born: 1885 Qodshanis, Hakkari, Ottoman Empire
- Died: 27 March 1920 (aged 34–35) Baquba, Ottoman Empire
- Denomination: Christian, Assyrian Church of the East
- Residence: Qodshanis, Hakkari, Ottoman Empire and later Urmia, Persia
- Occupation: Cleric

Mar Shimun XX Paulos (1885 in Qodshanis, Hakkari, Ottoman Empire – 27 April 1920 in Baquba, Ottoman Empire) served as Catholicos-Patriarch of the Assyrian Church of the East. from 1918 to 1920.

Paulos was born into a large religious family which included his uncle Rubil (Shimun XVIII), his brother Benyamin (Mar Shimun XIX), his sister Surma, his twin brother Zaia and his brother David.

His brother, Catholicos-Patriarch Mar Shimun XIX Benyamin, was killed along with several of his followers by Simko Shikak (Ismail Agha Shikak), a Kurdish agha during peace talks. Mar Shimun XX Paulos was elected on 23 March 1918. He was consecrated in the ancient Church of Mart Maryam (Saint Mary) in Urmia by the metropolitan Mar Eskhaq Khnanisho and the bishops Mar Eliya Abuna of Alqosh, Mar Yosip Khnanisho of Shemsdin (the metropolitan's designated successor), and Mar Zaya Sargis of Jilu.

On 20 August 1918, for fear of persecution from the Ottoman Turks during their campaign of genocide against Armenians, Assyrians, and other Christians of the Ottoman Empire, the newly elected Catholicos-Patriarch fled with about 60,000 of his people from Urmia in Iran seeking the protection of the British in Iraq. 15,000 of his followers died on the way. The survivors were in a camp in Baquba, about 50 kilometers north of Baghdad.

The episcopacy of the Autocephalous Church of the East at this time consisted only of four bishops: Mar Yosip Khnanisho, Mar Zaya Sargis of Jilu, Mar Yalda Yahballaha of Barwari and Mar Abimalek Timothy (South India).

Becoming sick, Shimun XX spent his short patriarchal days at Mor Mottai monastery belonging to the Syriac Orthodox Church of Antioch. He died on 27 April 1920 of tuberculosis. He was buried on 9 May 1920 in the Armenian cemetery in Baghdad.

Mar Shimun XX Paulos' successor was Shimun XXI Eshai (son of his brother David); Eshai was 12 years old at this time and Paulos’ sister Surma acted as regent for several years, working with the Metropolitans and looking after secular affairs. Eshai was the last of the hereditary patriarchs and served until 1975.

== See also ==
- List of patriarchs of the Church of the East

== Sources ==
- Baum, Wilhelm; Winkler, Dietmar W. (2003). The Church of the East: A Concise History. London-New York: Routledge-Curzon. ISBN 9781134430192.
- Baumer, Christoph (2006). The Church of the East: An Illustrated History of Assyrian Christianity. London-New York: Tauris. ISBN 9781845111151.
- Coakley, James F. (1992). The Church of the East and the Church of England: A History of the Archbishop of Canterbury's Assyrian Mission. Oxford: Clarendon Press. ISBN 9780198267447.
- Coakley, James F. (1996). "The Church of the East since 1914". The Bulletin of the John Rylands Library. 78 (3): 179–198. doi:10.7227/BJRL.78.3.14.
- Rudolf Macuch:History of the late and neusyrischen literature. De Gruyter, Berlin 1976, 253ff. ISBN 3-11-005959-2
- Austin: The Baqubah Refugee Camp. An Account of Work on behalf of the Persecuted Assyrian Christians, The Faith Press, London 1920
- David Wilmshurst:The Ecclesiastical Organization of the Church of the East, 1318-1913. (Corpus Scriptorum Christianorum Orientalium 582 / Subs. 104). Peeters, Leuven 2000, 367th ISBN 90-429-0876-9.

Church of the East titles
| Preceded by Mar Shimun XIX Benyamin | Catholicos-Patriarch of the Church of the East; 1918–1920 | Succeeded by Mar Shimun XXI Eshai |
