= Shemsdin (East Syriac ecclesiastical province) =

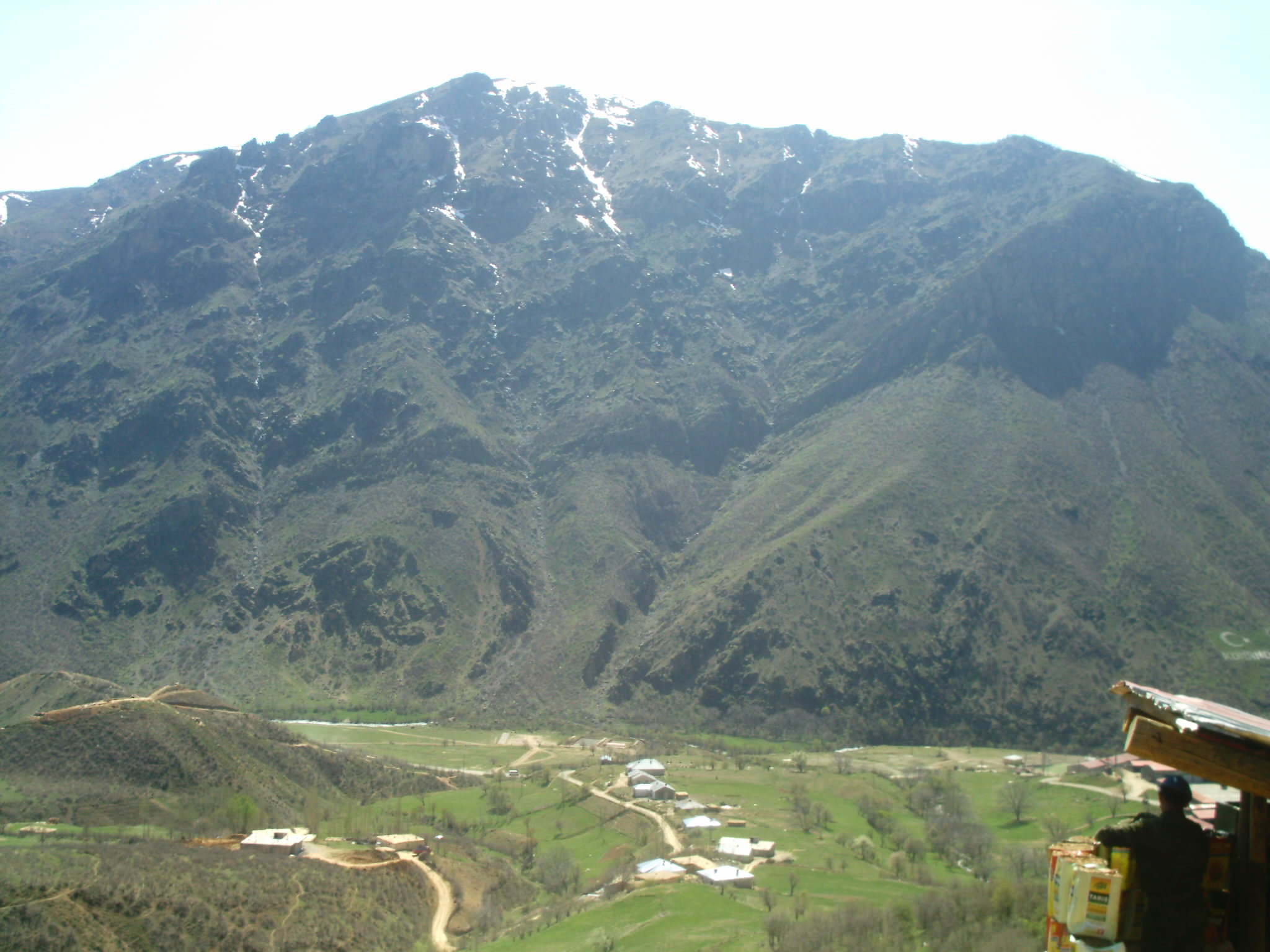
The mountainous Shemsdin district

The Metropolitanate of Shemsdin, created after the 1552 schism in the Church of the East, the predecessor to the Assyrian Church of the East, was the second most important ecclesiastical province of the Qudshanis patriarchate after the province of the patriarch himself. The metropolitans or matrans of Shemsdin traditionally took the name Hnanishoʿ and lived in the Shemsdin village of Mar Ishoʿ in the sub-district of Rustaqa. There were around twelve metropolitans of Shemsdin between the sixteenth and twentieth centuries, most of whom were chosen by hereditary succession. The last metropolitan of Shemsdin, Mar Yosip Khnanisho (also known as Mar Joseph Hnanisho) died in Iraq in 1977, and the office of mutran lapsed on his death.

== Background ==
After the schism of 1552 most of the East Syriac Christians living in the Hakkari and Urmi regions gave their loyalty to the Shemʿon line of patriarchs, who fixed their seat in the seventeenth century in the village of Qudshanis, a few miles to the northeast of Julamerk. The Nestorian population of these regions was estimated by the Anglican missionary Lewes Cutts in 1877 at 10,638 families (about 75,000 individuals). There was also a large Chaldean Catholic community in the Salmas district, perhaps 10,000 strong.

Whereas the Mosul patriarchs were simply religious leaders, whose succession depended on the agreement of the Ottoman authorities, the Qudshanis patriarchs were also quasi-independent tribal chiefs, enjoying a certain freedom of manoeuvre to balance between the Ottoman authorities and their nominally-subject Kurdish emirs. This dual position gave the Qudshanis patriarchate a unique character. Nineteenth-century visitors to Qudshanis described a patriarchal rule which resembled that of a medieval baron. The patriarch derived an income from the farm produce of his parishioners, and took a share of church collections. His rule ultimately rested on the prestige of the patriarchal family, which was recognized by all the East Syrians in the patriarchate, and it was common for them to swear an oath 'by the head of Mar Shemʿon'. As in the Mosul patriarchate, hereditary succession was customary by the nineteenth century, and each patriarch would consecrate a 'guardian of the throne' (natar kursya), normally a nephew, from a pool of younger relations, who lived an ascetic communal existence as 'Nazirites'.

The Qudshanis patriarchate had about a dozen dioceses in the nineteenth century, divided between the Seert, Berwari and Hakkari regions in Turkey and the Urmi region in Persia. The patriarch was assisted by a senior metropolitan, or mutran, invariably named Hnanishoʿ (Syriac: ܚܢܢܝܫܘܥ), in charge of the large diocese of Shemsdin in the Hakkari region, who deputized for him and enjoyed a prestige and power second only to his own.

== Metropolitans of Shemsdin ==
Between the fifth and the fourteenth centuries the Shemsdin district was included in the diocese of Beth Bgash in the province of Adiabene.

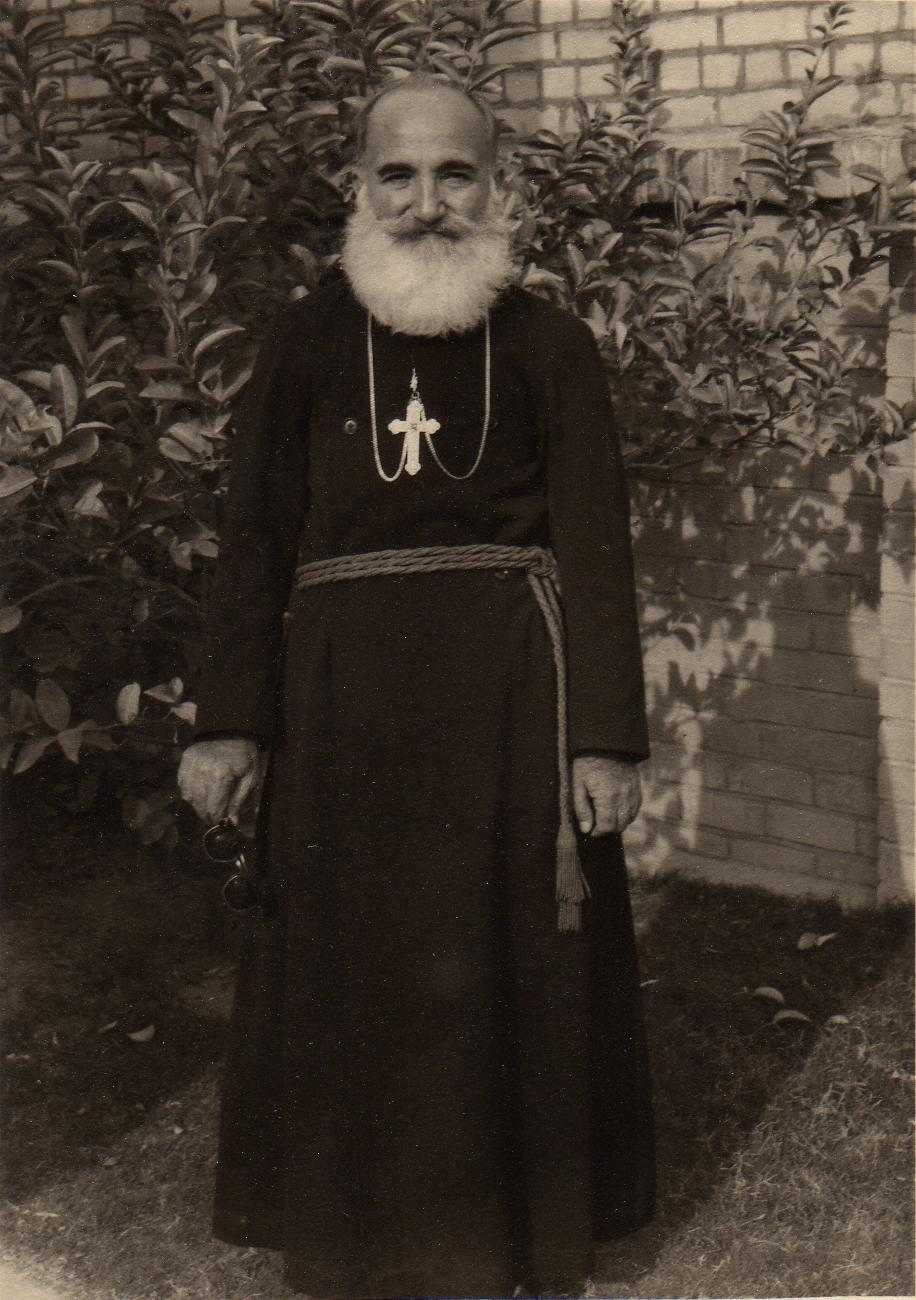
The mutran Joseph Hnanishoʿ (1893–1977), photographed in Baghdad

The diocese of Shemsdin was created after the schism of 1552, probably by the second Catholic patriarch ʿAbdishoʿ IV, probably a deformation of 'Shapatan', the Shemsdin district. The metropolitan Hnanishoʿ of 'Rustaqa, Taron [Tergawar] and Urmi', dependent on the third Catholic patriarch Shemʿon VIII Yahballaha, is mentioned in a colophon of 1577. A metropolitan of 'Sepatkai' named Hnanishoʿ, probably the same man, was one of the signatories of a letter of 1580 from the fourth Catholic patriarch Shemʿon IX Denha to pope Gregory XIII.

The patriarch Eliya VII (1591–1617), in response to a request from the Vatican, provided information on the composition of the rival East Syriac hierarchies in two reports, made in 1607 and 1610 respectively. The report of 1610 mentions the metropolitan Hnanishoʿ of 'Solotam' (dependent on the patriarch Shemʿon X, and the bishop Joseph of 'Solotam', dependent on Eliya VII and possibly to be identified with the bishop Joseph of Rustaqa mentioned in 1607.

One or more metropolitans of Shemsdin named Hnanishoʿ are mentioned together with the patriarch Shemʿon in colophons of 1680 and 1715 and in a series of five colophons from 1724 to 1732, all from the Tergawar district; and a manuscript was copied in 1700 by the priest Habil, son of the priest Hoshaba, 'cousin of the patriarch Mar Shemʿon and the metropolitan Mar Hnanishoʿ.

A manuscript was copied in 1730 by the priest David, 'metropolitan natar kursya of Shemsdin', presumably a nephew of the metropolitan Hnanishoʿ.

There are several other eighteenth-century references to metropolitans of Shemsdin. A metropolitan Hnanishoʿ 'of Rustaqa' is mentioned in colophons of 1743 and 1745, associated with the patriarchs 'Mar Shemʿon the fifth' and 'Mar Eliya' respectively. A metropolitan named Hnanishoʿ Ishoʿyahb (or Ishaʿya), 'who lives in Mar Ishoʿ of Rustaqa' is mentioned in a colophon of 1761 from the Tergawar district. A metropolitan of Shemsdin named Hnanishoʿ is mentioned in colophons of 1786, 1815 and 1818.

A metropolitan of Shemsdin named Hnanishoʿ was mentioned by the Anglican missionary George Percy Badger in 1850:

There is another large district in central Coordistan, inhabited by Nestorians, called Be-Shems ood-Deen, under the episcopal jurisdiction of Mar Hnan-Yeshua, who resides at Rustaka. The Metropolitan of this province for the time being consecrates the Patriarch. He has three suffragans, whose dioceses include the districts of Ter Gawar, Mar Gawar, Somâva, Bradostnai, and Mahmedayeh.

Badger's Hnanishoʿ seems to have been succeeded by the metropolitan Joseph Hnanishoʿ in 1864, who is last mentioned in 1884 by Riley. He was succeeded in 1884 by Isaac Hnanishoʿ, who died in Kermanshah in 1918 during the arduous flight to Hamadan.

Isaac Hnanishoʿ was succeeded as mutran in April 1919 by his nephew Joseph Hnanishoʿ, who was consecrated a bishop at the age of thirty-two on 10 August 1914 by the patriarch Shemʿon XIX Benjamin. He was among the bishops who escaped to Iraq in 1918, where he spent the rest of his life. He fixed his residence at Harir, and after the exile of the patriarch Shemʿon XXI Ishaʿya in 1933 effectively became the head of the East Syriac church in Iraq. He died in Baghdad on 3 July 1977, and the diocese of Shemsdin lapsed after his death.

== Further details ==
The following table, taken from the article Matran family of Shamizdin, provides further details on the metropolitans of Shemsdin. Although its provenance is not clear, the details it provides tally with the information given in earlier paragraphs, and it may derive from a reliable source. The ten mutrans listed were all members of the Gida family, perhaps originally from Erbil. According to tradition the first mutran, Sargis, migrated to Shemsdin from the village of Deire & Komane in the Sapna valley near ʿAmadiya, settling for a while in the Nerwa village of ʿAlih. He was a cousin of the patriarch Shemʿon XIII Denha (1662–1700), who consecrated him metropolitan of Shemsdin in 1663. The sixteenth- and early seventeenth-century metropolitans of Shemsdin had been chosen in accordance with the canon law of the Church of the East, by uniate patriarchs in communion with Rome, but the appointment of Sargis marked a return to the old custom of hereditary succession in the Qudshanis patriarchate. All subsequent metropolitans of Shemsdin were appointed from members of the Gida family.

Name	Ordinal	Dates	Place of burial	notes
Sargis Hnanishoʿ	[I]	1630–1700	Church of Mar Ishoʿ of Rustaqa, Shemsdin district	consecrated in 1663
Hnanishoʿ	[II]	1665–1735	Church of Mar Ishoʿ of Rustaqa, Shemsdin district	none
IshoʿHnanishoʿ	[III]	1687–1757	Church of Mart Shmuni, Sharukhiya, Diyarbakır district	died returning from Jerusalem
David Hnanishoʿ	[IV]	1714–1784	Church of Mar Ishoʿ of Rustaqa, Shemsdin district	none
Ishaʿya Hnanishoʿ	[V]	1741–1811	Church of Mar Ishoʿ of Rustaqa, Shemsdin district	none
Hnanishoʿ	[VI]	1763–1833	Church of Mar Yaʿqob, Darband, Tergawar district	none
Hnanishoʿ	[VII]	1790–1862	Church of Mar Thomas, Balulan, Tergawar district	none
Joseph Hnanishoʿ	[VIII]	1807–1884	Church of Mar Ishoʿ of Rustaqa, Shemsdin district	metropolitan for 22 years
Isaac Hnanishoʿ	[IX]	1844–1918	Special Shrine, Kermanshah district, Iran	metropolitan for 34 years
Joseph Hnanishoʿ	[X]	1893–1977	Church of Mart Maryam, Naeriya district, Baghdad, Iraq	metropolitan for 58 years

== Suffragan dioceses ==
Badger mentioned in 1850 that the mutran had three suffragan bishops, responsible for the Tergawar, Mergawar and Baradost districts, but did not mention their names. A few years later the mutran had three suffragan bishops, Sabrishoʿ 'of Gawar', Yohannan 'of Tuleki' and Denha 'of Tis', mentioned by Cutts in 1877, by Maclean and Browne in 1884 and by Riley in 1888 (who gave details of their jurisdictions), and by several other sources. Two of the three may well have been consecrated as early as 1850, but the third was 'a very young man, not more than twenty-five' in 1877, and could not have been a bishop for more than about a decade at most. Although all three men worked primarily within the mutran's diocese of Shemsdin and Tergawar, their dioceses were ad personam and not territorial, their responsibilities not clearly defined, and their formal titles uncertain.

The bishop Sabrishoʿ 'of Gawar' was responsible for the southern half of the Gawar plain and 'a few upland villages in Persia, near Urmi'. He is last mentioned in 1901, when a group of East Syriacs at Urmi, disenchanted with the Russian missionaries, wrote to the Archbishop of Canterbury to propose forming a separate church under his leadership.

The bishop Yohannan 'of Tuleki' or 'of Shemsdin' was responsible only for the village of Tuleki in Tergawar, which had been detached some years earlier from the diocese of Shemsdin. His brother Denha of Tuleki was the archdeacon of the mutran, and was described by the Anglican mission in 1893 as 'a bishop without diocese'. He may have had some responsibility beyond his own village, as he is mentioned in a colophon of 1895 from the nearby village of Sire in the Baranduz district. He died shortly before 1911, and was described by the Anglican missionary William Ainger Wigram as 'a feeble old man, noted only for possessing in his house the fiercest fleas in all Mergawar'.

The bishop Denha 'of Tis' or 'of Tergawar' is first mentioned in 1862, as one of the signatories of Sophoniah's report. His diocese consisted only of the Shemsdin village of Tis, detached like Tuleki from the mutran's diocese. For several years before 1909 he was responsible for those East Syriacs in and around Urmi who did not join the Russian Orthodox church, and in 1909 was transferred to the Sulduz district. He was among a group of 45 East Syriac Christians executed by the Turkish army after its capture of Urmi in 1915, after an unsuccessful attempt by the Anglican missionary Yaroo Neesan to ransom him.

== Topographical survey ==
The Shemsdin district lay south of Gawar and east of Sat, with Dasht to its East and Bradost to its south, along the upper reaches of the Shamdinan or Neri river and was centred on the small town of Neri. Besides the Shemsdin district itself which was part of Hakkari province, the ecclesiastical province of Shemsdin included the Shirwan, Bradost, Rawanduz and Derrenaye districts and the lower Gawar plain in eastern Turkey, and the Tergawar and Mergawar districts just across the border in Persia. The Shirwan, Bradost and Rawanduz districts are now in Iraq.

According to the Anglican missionary George Percy Badger, the Shemsdin district and the Urmi region together contained 4,500 East Syriac families, with 34 priests and 38 churches, in 1850. It is clear from other sources for the population of the Urmi region that this estimate was too low.

In 1877 Edward Cutts listed twenty-six East Syriac villages in the Shemsdin district, containing 626 East Syriac families with 22 churches. Unusually, he did not record which villages had priests. This list can be conveniently consulted in David Wilmshurst's study, The Ecclesiastical Organisation of the Church of the East, 1318–1913, published in 2000. A recently published bilingual book by Youel Baaba has supplied the Syriac names of all of the villages mentioned by Cutts.

There are a number of minor orthographical divergences between the names of the villages as given by Cutts, Wilmshurst and Baaba, but the three lists can be readily matched. The most curious feature of Baaba's list is that it gives the name Shapid for the important village of Shapat (called Shaput by Cutts). Besides being a village name, Shapat was also an alternative name for the Shemsdin district, and the variant forms Shapat (ܫܦܛ) and Shapatan (ܫܦܛܢ) and the corresponding adjective Shapatnaya (ܫܦܛܢܐܝܐ) are amply attested in manuscript colophons.

East Syrian Communities in the Shemsdin district, 1877

Name of Village	Name in Syriac	Number of Families	Number of Churches
Balqaw	ܒܠܩܘ	7	0
Batuti	ܒܬܘܬܐ	13	0
Bawtur	ܒܘܬܘܪ	20	1
Bebabi	ܒܒܒܝ	–	1
Bediwi	ܒܕܐܒܐ	24	1
Begardi	ܒܓܪܕܐ	12	1
Biltunyo	ܒܝܠܬܘܢܝܘ	30	1
Dara	ܕܪܐ	4	1
Daron	ܕܪܘܢ	20	1
Dera	ܕܝܪܐ	10	1
Diyuri	ܕܝܘܪܝ	–	0
Garganaye	ܓܪܓܢܝܐ	–	–
Halana	ܗܠܢܐ	100	2
Harwonan	ܗܪܘܘܢܢ	40	1

Name of Village	Name in Syriac	Number of Families	Number of Churches
Isara	ܐܝܼܣܪܐ	30	1
Kigperzan	ܟܝܼܓܦܪܙܢ	–	–
Kyatuna	ܟܝܬܘܢܐ	100	1
Marta	ܡܪܬܐ	5	1
Mar Dinkha	ܡܪܝ ܕܢܚܐ	–	1
Nerdosha	ܢܪܕܘܫܐ	20	1
Rustaqa	ܪܘܣܬܩܐ	25	1
Sarunis	ܣܪܘܢܝܣ	40	1
Shapid	ܫܦܕ	20	1
Surseri	ܣܘܪܣܝܪܐ	70	1
Talana	ܬܠܢܐ	6	1
Tis	ܬܝܣ	30	1
Total		626	22

Popular memory has preserved the names of many of the churches mentioned by Cutts and perhaps some built later than 1877, including the churches of Saint John the Baptist and Mar Quriaqos in the village of Bediwi, the church of Mart Shmuni in Biltunyo, the church of Mar Giwargis in Halana, the churches of Mart Maryam and Mar Christopher in Harwonan, the church of Mar Shemʿon in Kyatuna, the church of Mar Ishoʿ in Rustaqa, and the church of Mar Quriaqos in Tis.

== Scribal activity in the Shemsdin district ==
A respectable number of manuscripts have survived from the Shemsdin district, particularly from the eighteenth century. The earliest surviving manuscripts from the district come from the end of the sixteenth century: a manuscript of 1582 copied by the scribe Giwargis, son of Shamso, in the church of Mart Maryam and Mar Christopher in Harwonan; and a manuscript of 1601 copied in the Tergawar village of Razga by the priest Joseph, son of the priest Hormizd, son of Dirbiz, son of Niyazar, of Shapat (Shemsdin), for the pilgrim Darwish 'of the tribe of the Behtimnaye', who gave it to the church of Mart Shmuni in the village of Rustaqa.

No other manuscripts have survived from the seventeenth century, but several were copied in the eighteenth century: in 1724 by the deacon ʿAziz of Kyatuna; in 1730 by the priest David; in 1743 by the priest Safar, son of Ishoʿ, of Beth Daiwe (Bediwi); in 1745 by an unknown scribe; in 1746 by the priest Shapur in the church of Mar Quriaqos in Bediwi; in 1747 by the priest Eliya of Bediwi; and in 1761 and 1786 by the priest Jalabi, son of Hosho, son of Hazzo, of Bediwi, in its church of Mar Quriaqos and John the Baptist.

Several nineteenth-century manuscripts were copied by Shemsdin scribes: in 1804 in the church of Mar Yaʿqob and Mar Giwargis in the unlocalised village of Rabnath by the priest Zerwandad, son of Safar; in 1819 in Ashitha by the priest Habil, of the mutran’s family; in 1826 by Zerwandad, son of Safar; in 1846 by the priest Denha of Nerdosha; and in 1850 in Bethlehem by the pilgrim Abraham of 'Gardyan' (Begardi).

Several other details on the Shemsdin district have been preserved. After the schism of 1552 the village of Rustaqa, also known as Mar Ishoʿ (ܡܪܝ ܥܫܘ), was the traditional residence of the mutran Hnanishoʿ. The village was named for Ishoʿ, the brother of the monk Behishoʿ of Kamul. According to Fiey the church of Kyatuna was dedicated to Mar Shemʿon, identified by the villagers with the fourth-century patriarch Shemʿon Bar Sabbaʿe but perhaps rather Mar Shemʿon, disciple of Mar Yonan the Slave.

A monastery of Mar Ezekiel, located 'near Rustaqa' and therefore to be sought in the Shemsdin district, is mentioned in a number of manuscript colophons between the sixteenth and nineteenth centuries. The monastery (not mentioned in the reports of 1607 and 1610, and perhaps rather a large church) is first mentioned in 1599, when a manuscript was copied for its superior the priest Warda, son of the deacon Mushe. The bishop Yohannan of Anzel, who died shortly before 1755, is mentioned as the monastery's superior in colophons of 1804 and 1815, and is said to have 'built Mar Ezekiel on the border of Daryan' in a colophon of 1824, implying that he was responsible for restoring the monastery. The colophon of a manuscript of 1826 by his nephew the priest Zerwandad, son of Safar, mentions that the scribe came from 'the village of Mar Ezekiel of Shemsdin'. A manuscript copied in 1897 in Urmi mentions the mutran's archdeacon Denha of Tuleki, 'archdeacon of the monastery of Mar Ezekiel by Rustaqa'.
