= Shimun XVIII Rubil =

Mar Shimun XVIII Rubil
- Catholicos-Patriarch of the Church of the East
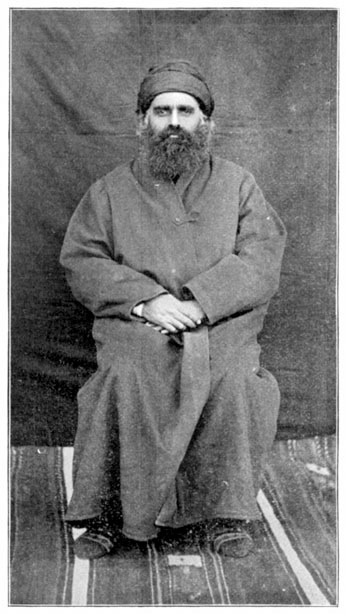
- Shimun XVIII Rubil in 1897
- Church: Church of the East
- Diocese: Patriarchal Diocese of Qodshanis
- See: Holy Apostolic See of Seleucia-Ctesiphon
- Installed: 1861
- Term ended: 1903
- Predecessor: Mar Shimun XVII Abraham
- Successor: Mar Shimun XIX Benyamin

Orders
- Rank: Catholicos-Patriarch

Personal details
- Born: 1844 Qodshanis, Hakkari
- Died: 23 March 1903 (aged 58–59) Qodshanis, Hakkari
- Denomination: Christian, Assyrian Church of the East
- Residence: Qodshanis, Hakkari

Mar Shimun XVIII Rubil (also known as Simon XVIII Rouel or Rowil) served as the Catholicos-Patriarch of what would come to be called the Assyrian Church of the East from 1861 until 1903, succeeding his uncle Shimun XVII Abraham. He led the church from Qodshanis, in southeastern Turkey. In 1869, he received an invitation from the Vatican to attend the First Vatican Council as an observer, but he did not accept the invitation, and he also rejected other initiatives for the union with the Catholic Church.

The Catholicos-Patriarch died on March 16, 1903, and was succeeded by Shimun XIX Benyamin.

== Sources ==
- Baum, Wilhelm; Winkler, Dietmar W. (2003). The Church of the East: A Concise History. London-New York: Routledge-Curzon. ISBN 9781134430192.
- Baumer, Christoph (2006). The Church of the East: An Illustrated History of Assyrian Christianity. London-New York: Tauris. ISBN 9781845111151.
- Coakley, James F. (1992). The Church of the East and the Church of England: A History of the Archbishop of Canterbury's Assyrian Mission. Oxford: Clarendon Press. ISBN 9780198267447.
- Wilmshurst, David (2000). The Ecclesiastical Organisation of the Church of the East, 1318–1913. Louvain: Peeters Publishers. ISBN 9789042908765.
- Wilmshurst, David (2011). The martyred Church: A History of the Church of the East. London: East & West Publishing Limited. ISBN 9781907318047.

Church of the East titles
Preceded by Mar Shimun XVII Abraham	Catholicos-Patriarch of the Church of the East; 1861–1903	Succeeded by Mar Shimun XIX Benyamin
