= Shimun XXI Eshai =

119th Catholicos-Patriarch of the Church of the East

Mar Eshai Shimun XXI
- Patriarch
- Mar Eshai Shimun XXI
- Native name: ܡܪܝ ܐܝܫܝ ܫܡܥܘܢ ܟܓ.
- Church: Assyrian Church of the East
- See: Holy Apostolic See of Seleucia-Ctesiphon
- Installed: 20 June 1920
- Term ended: 5 November 1975
- Predecessor: Mar Shimun XX Paulos (1918–1920)
- Successor: Mar Dinkha IV (1976–2015)

Orders
- Rank: Catholicos-Patriarch

Personal details
- Born: Eshai d'Mar Shimun; 26 February 1908 Konak, Hakkari, Ottoman Empire (now Hakkari Province, Turkey)
- Died: 6 November 1975 (aged 67) San Jose, California, United States
- Buried: Turlock Memorial Park

Mar Eshai Shimun XXI (Syriac: ܡܪܝ ܐܝܫܝ ܫܡܥܘܢ ܟܓ.; 26 February 1908 – 6 November 1975), sometimes known as Mar Eshai Shimun XXIII, Mar Shimun XXIII Ishaya, Mar Shimun Ishai, or Simon Jesse, was Patriarch of the Assyrian Church of the East from 1920 until his murder on 6 November 1975 in San Jose, California. He was consecrated as patriarch at 12 years old.

== Biography ==
Mar Eshai was born on 26 February 1908 in Qudchanis, the mountainous region located in southern Turkey. Mar Eshai was raised with great care while receiving the necessary theological and liturgical training by the Archdeacon of the Patriarch, Thoma of Ashita and by the Metropolitan of Rustaqa, Mar Yosip Khnanisho, who was also his uncle.

At the age of twelve, due to geopolitical upheavals at the time, Mar Eshai was ordained as Patriarch in 1920, succeeding his uncle, Shimun XX Paulos. His aunt Surma acted as regent for several years, working with the Metropolitans and looking after secular affairs. He was educated in England, studying theology at Canterbury and at Westcott House, University of Cambridge.

As early as 1926 at the age of 18, the Patriarch attended the Nicene Council Commemoration held at Westminster Abbey, London. The Church and State Conference held in Oxford and the Faith and Order Conference held in Edinburgh were both attended by Mar Eshai in 1937. The distinguished Athenaeum Club of London had favoured Eshai by conferring an honorary membership. He was also a member of the American Historical Society and other organizations, as well as being a representative to the World Council of Churches and being given an entry in Who's Who.

Numerous appeals and publications concerning the Assyrian Question, written by the Patriarch and presented to the British Government and various international bodies, highlight him as a writer of distinction. He was the translator or author of several books on the theology and history of the Church of the East (see "Works" section.) The volatile political environment and uncertainties for the church caused in 1933 by the independence of Iraq from the British mandate rule forced the patriarch to be exiled to Cyprus, away from the new see in Bebadi. In 1940, he relocated again, to Chicago, Illinois, in the United States.

Prior to Mar Eshai Shimun's intervention, Assyrians living among their Islamic neighbors shared a tenuous relationship that was firmly rooted in mistrust by both sides. Therefore, in 1948 Eshai made a revolutionary announcement of a new policy for the Assyrian people and the Assyrian Church of the East. Through direct contact with embassy representatives of the Middle Eastern countries in Washington and at the United Nations Headquarters, he broke down the walls of suspicion and misunderstanding. This new policy decreed Assyrians and members of the Assyrian Church of the East all over the world to remain as loyal and faithful citizens of the countries in which they lived, something that had never been done before.

Mar Eshai became an American citizen about 1949 and settled in the San Francisco area in 1954. In 1964, a dispute over hereditary succession and church calendars caused the metropolitan of the Assyrian Church of the East in India (known there as the Chaldean Syrian Church) to break away and Mar Thoma was stopped from his duties in the Church of the East. In 1995 Mar Eshai's successor, Mar Dinkha IV, was able to mostly heal the rift. 17% (the Ancient Church of the East) remain separated from the main body of the Assyrian Church of the East.

Mar Eshai sought to resign as patriarch for health reasons in the late 1960s, but he was persuaded to remain in office. Some activists within the church wanted the patriarch to take a more active role in pushing for a homeland for the Assyrian people, as he had before 1933.

In 1972, Mar Eshai opted to step down from his position as patriarch, and he married the next year. This was controversial, as it contravened longstanding traditions about bishops being able to marry in the Eastern Church.

Rumors of a conspiracy among those who were went against the patriarch's decisions and wished to have him replaced began to circulate. On 6 November 1975, the patriarch was shot and killed at the door of his home in San Jose, California, by David Malek Ismail; the Malek Ismail family had been in charge of protecting the Shimun patriarchal line for generations. According to trial records, Ismail said he was upset over the patriarch's marriage; however, the records suggest links between Ismail and church dissidents. According to Deputy District Attorney Brian Madden, the murder of the patriarch Mar Shimun was the outcome of a plot among church dissidents possibly related to land ownership in the Middle East. Ismail was convicted of first-degree murder, sentenced to life imprisonment and was released after 12 years.

When the church council met in London on 17 October 1976, it elected as patriarch Mar Dinkha IV (who had been bishop of Tehran).

== Works ==

Many Syriac books were translated into English by Mar Eshai Shimun. Some of which are:

- Portions of the Aramaic liturgy;
- The Book of Hymns and Praises;
- Synodical Rules of the Church of the East;
- The Book of Marganitha, a standard theological work of the Church of the East;
- The publication of the homilies of Mar Narsai, the great saint and scholar of the fifth century, in two volumes, numbering more than 1400 pages;
- along with seventy pages of introduction and critical apparatus in English by Shimun as well as countless outstanding sermons on the historical doctrine of the Church of the East.

=== The Assyrian Tragedy ===
The Assyrian Tragedy documents the national struggle of the Assyrian people prior, during, and after World War I. It was originally published anonymously in 1934. Authorship of the book was posthumously attributed to Mar Eshai Shimun XXIII.

Most of the material in the book is his personal letters to various heads of governments and organizations and their replies. The book was reprinted in January, 1988 by Mr. Sargis Michael, over a decade after the assassination of Mar Eshai.

== See also ==
- List of patriarchs of the Church of the East
- Assyrian Neo-Aramaic
- Assyrian people
- List of Assyrians

== Sources ==
- Baum, Wilhelm; Winkler, Dietmar W. (2003). The Church of the East: A Concise History. London-New York: Routledge-Curzon. ISBN 9781134430192.
- Baumer, Christoph (2006). The Church of the East: An Illustrated History of Assyrian Christianity. London-New York: Tauris. ISBN 9781845111151.
- Coakley, James F. (1996). "The Church of the East since 1914". The Bulletin of the John Rylands Library. 78 (3): 179–198. doi:10.7227/BJRL.78.3.14.
- Foster, John (1939). The Church of the T'ang Dynasty. London: Society for Promoting Christian Knowledge.
- Mooken, Aprem (2003). "The History of the Assyrian Church of the East in the Twentieth Century". INFLIBNET. Kottayam: St. Ephrem Ecumenical Research Institute.

Church of the East titles
Preceded by Mar Shimun XX Paulos	Catholicos-Patriarch of the Church of the East; 1920–1975	Succeeded by Mar Dinkha IV Khanania
