= Hnanisho =

Hnanisho (Syriac: ܚܢܢܝܫܘܥ), Hnanishoʿ, Ḥnanishoʿ, Henanisho, or Hanan-Ishoʿ may refer to:

- Hnanisho I, Patriarch of the Church of the East 686–698
- Hnanisho II, Patriarch of the Church of the East 773–780
- Many metropolitans of Shemsdin traditionally took the name Hnanishoʿ

== See also ==
- Enanisho, 7th-century monk with a similar name
