= Surma D'Bait Mar Shimun =

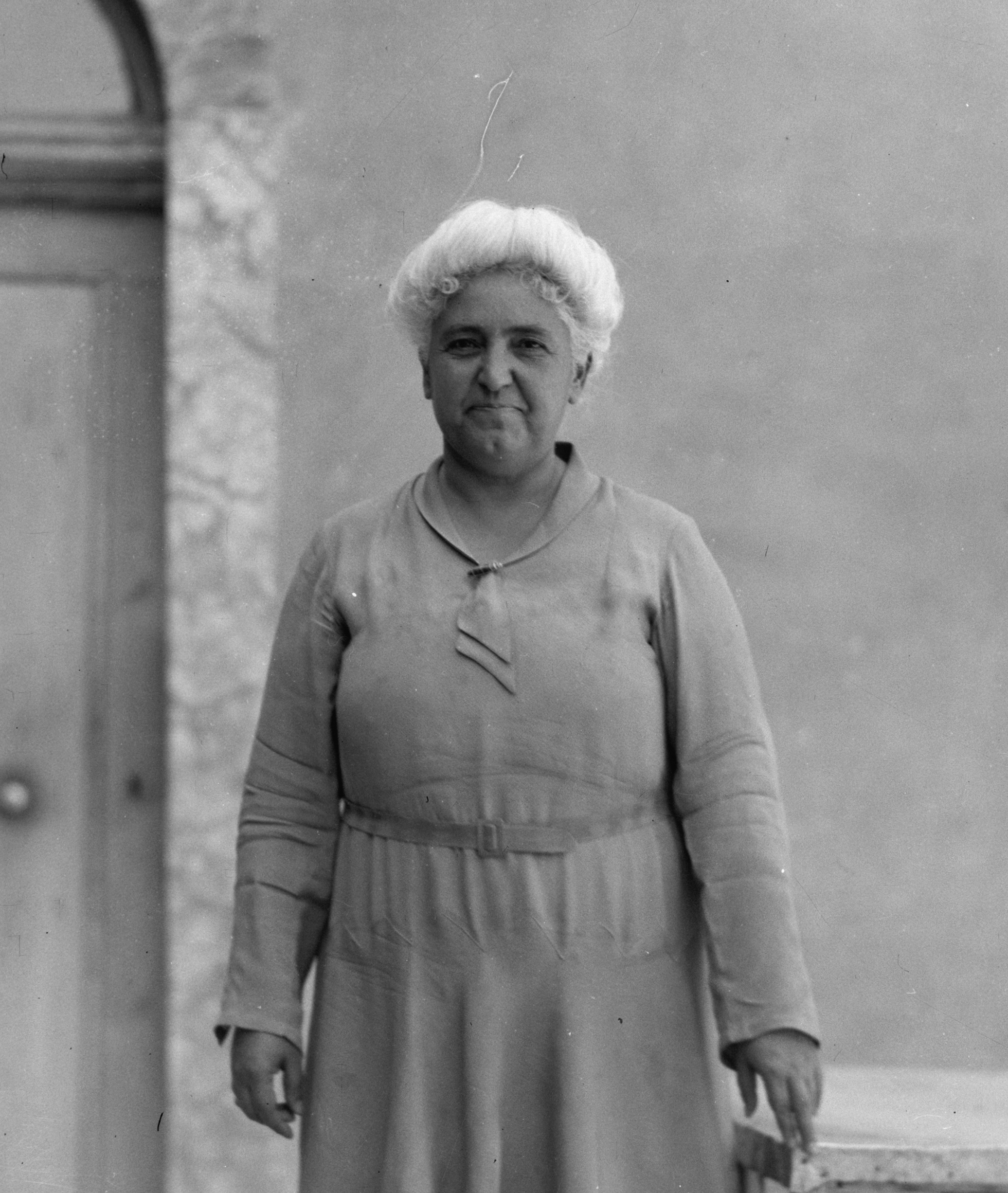
Lady Surma, Mosul, 1932

Lady Surma D'Bait Mar Shimun (27 January 1883 – 7 December 1975) was the sister of the Catholicos Patriarch of the Assyrian Church of the East and leader of the Assyrians, Mar Shimun XIX Benyamin.

== Biography ==
Lady Surma was born in Qudshanis in Hakkari. She was educated by Rev. W.H. Browne of the Archbishop of Canterbury mission where she became fluent in English. After the assassination of her brother by the Kurdish rebel Simko and succeeded by his younger brother, Mar Shimun XX Paulos. Surma Khanum (Lady Surma) practically became regent, and in 1918 she was invited by British authorities to present the Assyrian question in London and she also attended the Treaty of Versailles negotiations, probably as the only woman regent.

The descendants of the Assyrian Empire had lived as a semi-independent nation in the Hakari mountains, but they were massacred and driven out by the Ottomans and Kurds in 1915. In return they were promised an independent homeland by Britain, France, and Russia in 1918 in Northern Iraq – the Mosul district – but this promise was not fulfilled. Mar Paulus died of tuberculosis 1920 and was succeeded by his 12 years old nephew, Mar Eshai Shimun XXIII, (1908–75), who was also assassinated. When Mar Eshai went to school in England until 1927, she assisted the Metropolitans Mar Yosip Khnanisho of Rustaqa in Church affairs and was in charge of the secular affairs together with her brother, General David d'Mar Shimun, father of the Patriarch. She continued to act as a consultant throughout Mar Eshai's life, given her temporal and secular expertise.

At the time of the disturbances in 1933 in Iraq, the Patriarchal family were taken to Cyprus, where they remained until 1952 when they moved to England and finally settling in the United States in 1960 thanks to a private law enacted in Congress and signed by the President. She died in the year of 1975 in the city of Turlock, California.
