= Yosip Khnanisho =

Iraqi metropolitan bishop

Mār Yōsip Khnanisho
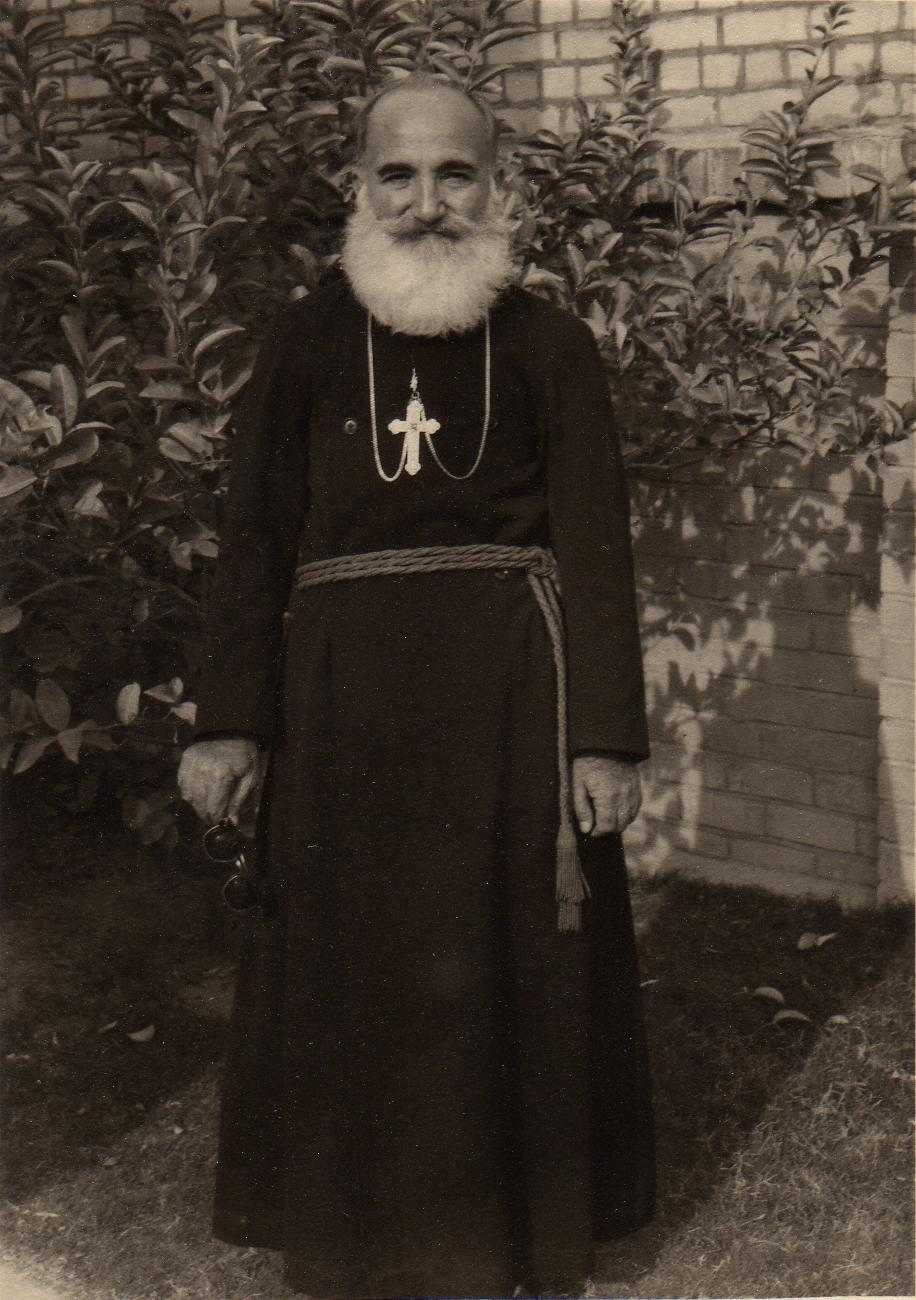
- The matran Joseph Hnanishoʿ (1893–1977), photographed in Baghdad

Metropolitan of Shemsdin
- Born: 1893
- Died: July 3, 1977 (aged 83–84)
- Venerated in: Assyrian Church of the East
- Feast: Second Sunday of July

Mār Yōsip Khnanisho (Syriac: ܡܪܝ ܝܘܣܦ ܚܢܢܝܫܘܥ), is the twelfth Metropolitan or Matran of Shemsdin from 1918 to 1977. He is a saint in the Assyrian Church of the East.

== Life ==
=== Hakkari ===
As it was the custom for an uncle to pass on to the first born nephew the Sacred Episcopal Office, Yōsip's mother abstained from meats until the child's birth and weaning. Yosip was born in 1893 into the Mar Khnanishu family, a family from which twelve Metropolitan Archbishops had come. He lived in the Village of Mar Ishoo in the region of Shamisdan in modern-day Turkey, near the monastery of Mar Ishoo, which had been built at the beginning of the 5th century.

Yosip was ordained a deacon at age 12 and ordained as a priest in 1912 at the age of 20. In 1914, he was sent as a delegate to participate in a meeting at the patriarchal cell in Qudchanis to discuss the effects of World War I on the Church and the nation and prepare for the changes that were expected to take place. While there, he was consecrated a Bishop on August 10, 1914 at age 22. He remained in Qudchanis until 1916. When the Assyrian Christians sought a safe haven elsewhere, Yosip took a great number of believers to the city of Baqooba.

=== Iraq ===
In 1918, Mār Yōsip was appointed as assistant to the Patriarch Mar Shimun XX Paulos as Locum Tenens. In December 1918 he was elevated to the rank of metropolitan of Baghdad and filled the role as Patriarchal administrator while then Patriarch Mar Shimun XX Paulos was sick, up until his death in 1920.

In 1933, he was made administrator of the Church in Iraq and the Middle East. In 1973 when Shimun XXI Eshai, Catholicos Patriarch of the Assyrian Church of the East, was exiled to Cyprus, Yosip Khnanisho was vested with responsibilities of administering the Church worldwide. At the same time, the Iraqi government issued a Republican decree appointing Yosip Khnanisho as the Supreme Head of all the Assyrians in Iraq.

=== Death ===
On the 3 July 1977, Yosip died in Baghdad, Iraq. His funeral services were conducted on 6 July 1977, at the Church of St George (Mar Gewargis) in Dora, a suburb of Baghdad. Approximately 12,000 Christians from various cities in Iraq attended the funeral of Mar Yosip Khnanisho.

Mār Yōsip Khnanisho Church in San Jose, California, and Mar Yosip Khnanisho Parish in Gilbert, Arizona are both named after the metropolitan.
