= Piros =

Piros or Piroš is a Hungarian surname, it means 'red'. Notable people with the surname include:

- Andrea Piros (born 1966), Swiss fencer
- Kamil Piroš (born 1978), Czech ice hockey player
- László Piros (1917–2006), Hungarian politician and military officer
- Zsombor Piros (born 1999), Hungarian tennis player
