= Shimun XIX Benyamin =

117th Catholicos-Patriarch of the Church of the East

Mar Benyamin XIX Shimun
- Catholicos-Patriarch of the Church of the East
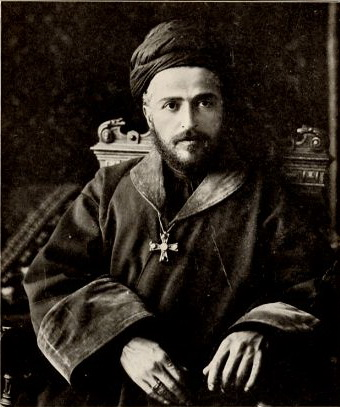
- Mar Shimun XIX Benyamin on or before 1913
- Church: Assyrian Church of the East
- Diocese: Patriarchal Diocese of Qodshanis
- See: Holy Apostolic See of Seleucia-Ctesiphon
- Installed: 30 March 1903
- Term ended: 18 March 1918
- Predecessor: Mar Shimun XVIII Rouel (1860/1861-1903)
- Successor: Mar Shimun XX Paulos (1918–1920)

Orders
- Rank: Catholicos-Patriarch

Personal details
- Born: 1887 Qodshanis, Hakkari, Ottoman Empire
- Died: 3 March 1918 (aged 30) Kuhnashahir, Persia
- Denomination: Christian, Assyrian Church of the East
- Residence: Qodshanis, Hakkari, Turkey and later Urmia, Persia
- Occupation: Cleric

Mar Shimun XIX Benyamin (1887–18 March 1918) (Syriac: ܡܪܝ ܒܢܝܡܝܢ ܫܡܥܘܢ ܥܣܪܝܢ ܘܩܕܡܝܐ) served as the Catholicos-Patriach of the Assyrian Church of the East from 1903 to 1918. He was consecrated a metropolitan on March 1, 1903, by his uncle, the Catholicos-Patriarch, and was eighteen years old when he succeeded him to the patriarchal see at Qudshanis for 15 years.

== Life ==
He was an ethnic Assyrian, born in 1887 in the village of Qochanis in the Hakkari Province, Ottoman Empire (modern-day southeastern Turkey). His paternal uncle and immediate predecessor was Mar Shimun XVIII Rubil, patriarch from 1860 to 1903. His father was Eshai, a brother of Shimun XVIII Rubil, and his mother was Asyat, daughter of Kambar from Iyl. He had six siblings: Isaiah, Zaya, Paulos (who succeeded him as Patriarch), David, Hormizd, Surma. His brother Hormizd was later killed while studying in Istanbul during the deportation of Armenian intellectuals on 24 April 1915.

== Death ==
Mar Shimun and Simko Shikak had planned to meet for future cooperation against the Turkish and Iranian governments, and eventually met in March 1918 in Kuhnashahir in Salmas. The meeting appeared to have gone well until the end, when Mar Shimun prepared to leave. Simko reportedly signaled to his men, who were hiding on the roof, to open fire, and they killed Mar Shimun and 150 of his armed guards. Others estimated the death toll at 75. There were reports from contemporaries that a Kurdish associate of Simko tried to warn Mar Shimun of the plot while serving tea, although too late. Simko also allegedly drank his blood in a blind rage. Followers and relatives of Mar Shimun began looting the districts of Urmia and Salmas and killing inhabitants, although Simko and his men had already retreated to the mountains and were unharmed, and the retaliation did not benefit the Assyrian forces, who were later forced to withdraw. The events seriously damaged Assyrian national aspirations.

== Quotes ==
- "It is impossible for me and my people to surrender after seeing the atrocities done to my Assyrian people by your government; therefore my brother is one, my people are many, I would rather lose my brother but not my nation."

== See also ==
- List of patriarchs of the Church of the East
- Our Smallest Ally
- Assyrian volunteers

== Sources ==
- Baum, Wilhelm; Winkler, Dietmar W. (2003). The Church of the East: A Concise History. London-New York: Routledge-Curzon. ISBN 9781134430192.
- Baumer, Christoph (2006). The Church of the East: An Illustrated History of Assyrian Christianity. London-New York: Tauris. ISBN 9781845111151.
- Coakley, James F. (1992). The Church of the East and the Church of England: A History of the Archbishop of Canterbury's Assyrian Mission. Oxford: Clarendon Press. ISBN 9780198267447.
- Coakley, James F. (1996). "The Church of the East since 1914". The Bulletin of the John Rylands Library. 78 (3): 179–198. doi:10.7227/BJRL.78.3.14.
- Wilmshurst, David (2000). The Ecclesiastical Organisation of the Church of the East, 1318–1913. Louvain: Peeters Publishers. ISBN 9789042908765.
- Wilmshurst, David (2011). The martyred Church: A History of the Church of the East. London: East & West Publishing Limited. ISBN 9781907318047.

Church of the East titles
Preceded by Mar Shimun XVIII Rubil	Catholicos-Patriarch of the Church of the East; 1903–1918	Succeeded by Mar Shimun XX Paulos
