= Wilhelm Baum (historian) =

Austrian historian, theologian and philosopher (born 1948)

Wilhelm Baum (born 1948 in Düsseldorf, Germany) is a German-Austrian historian, theologian, philosopher and publisher.

== Biography ==
Wilhelm Baum studied history, German language, and theology in Innsbruck, Rome, Mainz and Tübingen (two of his professors were Ernst Bloch and Hans Küng). In 1971 he became a doctor of philosophy and in 1999 a doctor of theology at Karl-Franzens-Universität Graz. In 1995, he taught medieval history at the University of Klagenfurt and in Graz.

Baum who lives in Klagenfurt, Austria, is the head of the publishing house Kitab-Verlag, which he founded in 1999. He's a PEN club member.

== Bibliography ==
Baum wrote books about Ludwig Wittgenstein and Karl Popper (translated into Spanish and Slovene) and studied the history of Christianity in the Near East and in India (Assyrian Church of the East and the Syriac Orthodox church). From an interest in minorities Baum also wrote books and articles about the history of Slovenes living in Carinthia.

== Books ==
The following of Baum's books were translated into English:

- Baum, Wilhelm; Winkler, Dietmar W. (2003). The Church of the East: A Concise History. London-New York: Routledge-Curzon. ISBN 9781134430192.
- Shirin. Christian – Queen – Myth of Love. A woman of late antiquity – Historical reality and literary effect (2004)
- Anton Kolig and Franz Wiegele. The Austrian painters of the "Nötsch circle" and Vienna about 1900 (2005)
