= Qudshanis =

Village in Hakkâri Province, Turkey

- Village
- Location within Turkey
- Coordinates: 37°39′7″N 43°47′53″E
- Country: Turkey
- Province: Hakkâri
- District: Hakkâri
- Population (2023): 30
- Time zone: UTC+3 (TRT)

Qudshanis (also: Kuçanis or Kochanes, officially Konak, Kurdish: Koçanis, Syriac: ܩܘܕܫܢܝܣ, romanized: Qūdšānīs , Syriac pronunciation: [quˈt͡ʃɑ.nɪs];), is a small village in the Hakkâri District of Hakkâri Province, Turkey. The village is populated by Kurds of the Pinyanişî tribe and population was 30 in 2023.

It was significant in the history of the Church of the East in that it was the seat of a line of patriarchs for many centuries until mid-1915, when Mar Shimun XIX Benyamin along with the rest of the Assyrians of Hakkari were forced to flee as part of the Sayfo.

== History ==
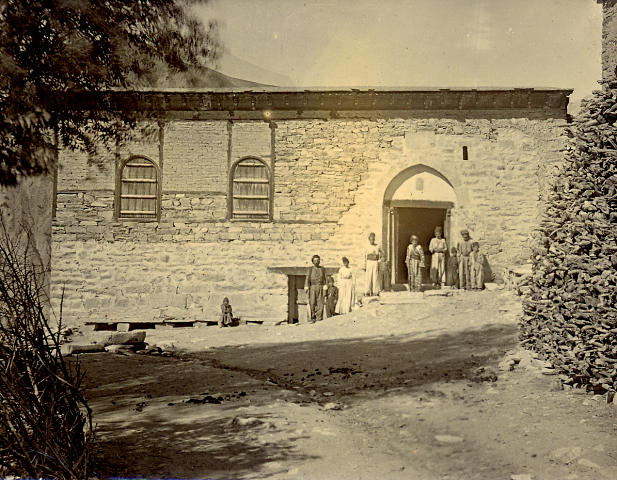
Residence of the Patriarch of the Church of the East in Qodshanis

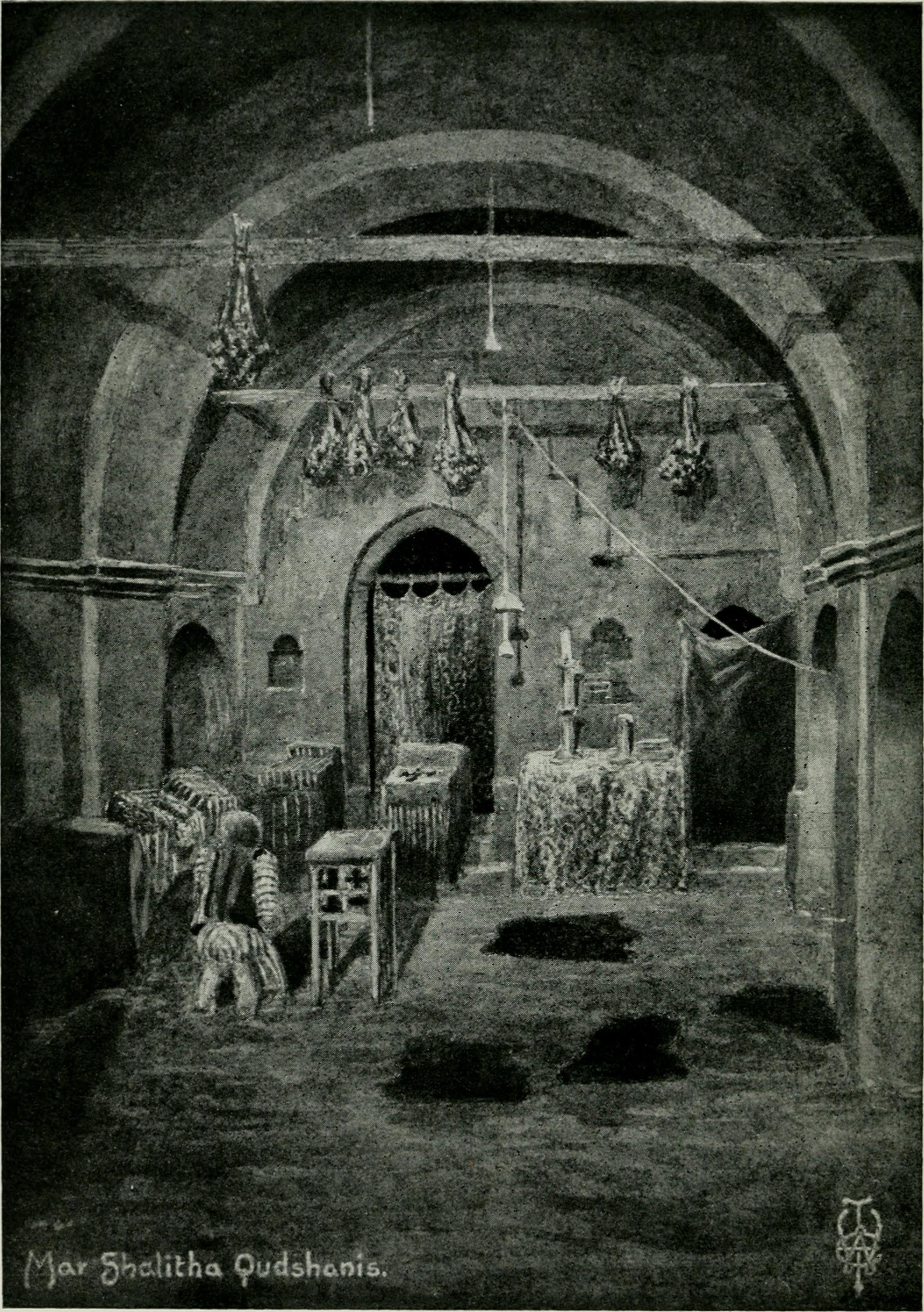
A sketch of the interior of the Patriarchal Church of Mar Shalita, from Wigram's The Cradle of Mankind: Life in Eastern Kurdistan. The church is still somewhat intact (although abandoned) to this day.

The village was founded in 1672 by Chaldean Catholics from the city of Amida who, upon settling here, broke off with the Catholic church and founded a new branch of the Church of the East in 1692, ruled by the Shimun line. From that point on the village functioned as the de facto capital of the Assyrian tribes in the region. The government of the Hakkari mountains was that of a tribal confederation, with Assyrian tribes such as the Tyari and Nochiya living in villages across the region, with their own leaders known as maliks (Syriac: ܡܠܟ). The tribes were subservient to the patriarch based in Qodchanis and paid him taxes, which the patriarch then gave to the Ottomans. Therefore, the patriarch functioned as a king of sorts for the Assyrians of the mountains, and his See in Qodchanis functioned as the capital of their confederation. The confederation was in effect almost like a vassal state ruled by the Ottoman Empire, and even then the Assyrians were not subservient to the Sultan, but rather the Patriarch. Upon his declaration of war in 1915, the tribes of the region went into open rebellion against the Turks.

In a relatively isolated area, Qodshanis was for many years cut off from the outside world up until 1829, when a German traveller discovered it. Visitors from the West began arriving as emissaries. One of these emissaries, an Englishman known as William Ainger Wigram, described it in his book The Cradle of Mankind: Life in Eastern Kurdistan (1922):

The village of Qudshanis, which is the residence of the Nestorian or Assyrian Patriarch, Mar Shimun, and the headquarters of his Church, has a marvellous situation. It lies on a sloping alp of rugged pasture, between two mountain torrents which spring from the towering snow-fields to the west of it; and which descend in gradually deepening gorges, enclosing the tongue-shaped plateau on which the village stands. They meet beneath the point of the tongue at the base of a lofty wedge of rock; and thence the united stream flows on, joined by others on its way, till it falls into the Zab some two hours below the village. Nestorian tradition regards the Zab as the Pison [or Pishon/Uizhun], one of the four rivers of Paradise; and the Patriarch will occasionally date his official letters from my cell on the River of the Garden of Eden.

== Notable people ==
- Shimun XXI Eshai (1908–1975), Patriarch of the Assyrian Church of the East.

== See also ==
- List of Assyrian villages
- Zagros Mountains
  - Mount Judi
