= Amar Khan Shikak =

Kurdish military leader and tribal chief

Amar Khan Sharifi Shikak
- عه‌مه‌ر خان شەریفی
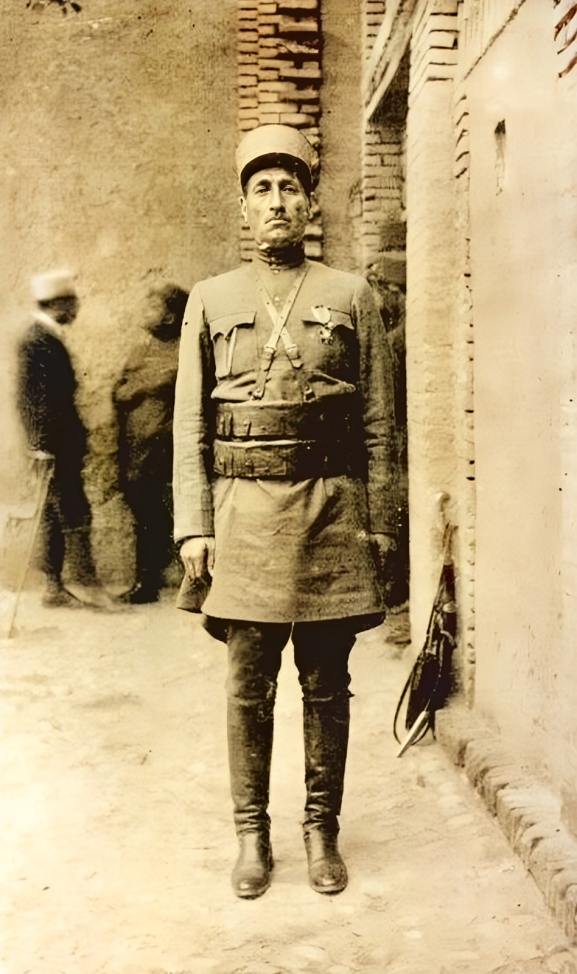
- Amar Khan Shikak, 1929
- Born: Amar Mohammad Sharif Sharifi; 1873; Zindasht, West Azerbaijan, Iran
- Died: 1958; Zindasht, West Azerbaijan, Iran
- Relatives: Simko Shikak
- Military career
- Allegiance: Republic of Mahabad
- Rank: Marshal
- Conflicts: Ottoman invasion of Persia (1906); World War I; Persian campaign (World War I); Battle of Dilman; Kurdish separatism in Iran; Simko Shikak revolt (1918–1922); Lakestan incident; Battle of Savuj Bulagh (1921); Battle of Charah; Battle of Sari Taj; Battle of Miandoab; Battle of Shekar Yazi; Battle of Sawcubilax; Battle of Tabriz; Simko Shikak revolt (1926); Jafar Sultan revolt; Iran crisis of 1946; Battle of Mamashah; Battle of Qahrawa

Amar Khan Sharifi (Kurdish: عه‌مه‌ر خانی شەریفی, Kurdish pronunciation: [ʕæˈmær xaːˈniː ʃæˈriːfi]; 1873 – 1958 in Zindasht, West Azerbaijan, Iran), better known as Amar Khan Shikak (Kurdish: عەمەر خانی شکاک, romanized: Emer Xanî Şikak) was a prominent Kurdish tribal leader from the Shekak tribe. He was the son of Mohammad Sharif Sharifi and played a significant role in the leadership of the Kardar and Shekak tribes following his father's death. Based on local accounts, Amar Khan was reported to be Simko's uncle, although others believed that he was Simko's cousin.

During the early 20th century, the Shekak tribe gained influence under the leadership of Simko Shikak, especially after receiving support from the Russian Empire. Amar Khan became Simko's chief aide among the Shekaks during this period. After Simko's assassination, he assumed the leadership of the Shekak tribe.

Amar Khan later aligned with Qazi Muhammad and the Republic of Mahabad.

== Career ==
Amar Khan served as the paramount chieftain of the Shikak tribe and was a notable figure in Iranian Kurdistan. He reportedly made a strong impression on American observers, including Kermit Roosevelt, who described him as 'the grand old man of Kurdistan', and William O. Douglas, who visited him after the fall of Mahabad.

Despite his high-ranking position within the Mahabad Republic, some historians have characterized his actions as opportunistic. He was appointed Minister of War and held the rank of Marshal in the republic. In addition, he was a member of the central committee of the Democratic Party of Iranian Kurdistan and a signatory of the Azerbaijani–Kurdish Treaty on April 23, 1946. During his time in the Mahabad, he reportedly maintained communication with George V. Allen, the American ambassador to Iran. Following the fall of Mahabad, it was through Allen's intervention that Amar Khan avoided execution by Iranian government.

== Military role ==
Amar Khan was known for his military expertise and strategic skill. His forces participated in multiple military operations under the Mahabad government. As the regime approached collapse, he withdrew his support and returned to his home in Zindasht.

== See also ==
- Simko Shikak revolt (1918–1922)
- Simko Shikak revolt (1926)
- List of Iranian Kurds
