= Simko Shikak revolt (1918–1922) =

Kurdish uprising in Iran

Simko Shikak Revolt
- Part of the Persian campaign, 1921 Persian coup d'état and Kurdish separatism in Iran
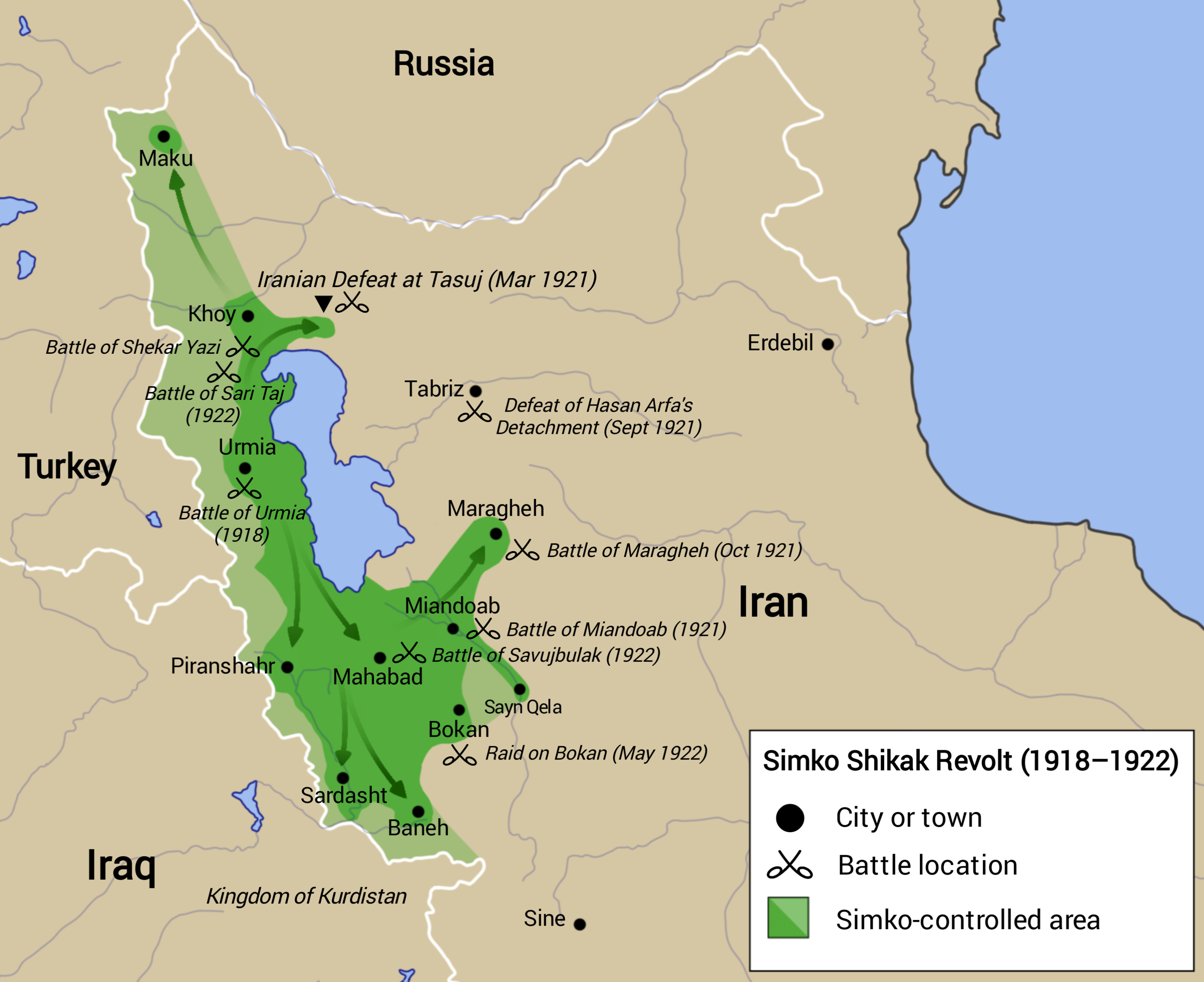
- Map showing the main locations and zones controlled by Simko Shikak during his revolt (1918–1922)
Date	1918–1922
Location	Northwestern Iran
Result	Iranian victory: Reza Shah seizes power in 1921, suppresses the revolt in 1922; Another attempt by Simko in 1926

Belligerents
Qajar Iran; Azerbaijani volunteers	(Simko Shikak) Kurdish forces; Kurdish tribes; Dehbokri; Mamash; Mangur; Several Luri tribes; Supported by: Ottoman Empire (1918–1920)

Commanders and leaders
(Qajar Iran) Reza Khan (Qajar Iran) Amir Arshad (Qajar Iran) Hasan Arfa (Qajar Iran) Major Malakzadeh † (Qajar Iran) Mohammad Taqi Pessian † (Qajar Iran) Khalo Ghorban † (Qajar Iran) Masoud Divan † (Qajar Iran) Zafar al-Dowleh (Qajar Iran) General Hassan Moqaddam	Simko Shikak; Amar Khan Shikak

Strength
37,000 (1918); 33,000 (1921–1922)	37,000 (1918); 33,000 (1921–1922) 1,000 (early stage); 5,000 (later stage): Dehbokri (1,700 soldier) Mamash (700 soldier) Mangur (700 soldier); Several hundred Ottoman soldiers and Turkish mercenaries

Casualties and losses
8,500 killed, captured and wounded: 200 irregular soldiers killed, including Amir Arshad; 150 gendarmes killed, including Mohammad Taqi Pessian; Along with Khalo Ghorban, 200 irregular troops killed; 600 Iranian gendarmes, including Major Malakzadeh, were killed; 1,500 civilians froze to death.	4,500 killed, captured and wounded
- Total: ~25,650 killed

The Simko Shikak revolt was an armed Ottoman-backed tribal Kurdish uprising against the Qajar dynasty of Iran from 1918 to 1922, led by Kurdish chieftain Simko Shikak from the Shekak tribe. During 1920–1922 under the leadership of Agha Simko, Kurdish tribal forces in Kurdish areas of the new born Iran challenged the authority of the central Persian government.

After Brigadier-General Reza Khan deposed the Qajars in a 1921 coup, he defeated Simko Shikak as well as several prominent rebel commanders such as Kuchik Khan and Colonel Pessian during the Iranian events of 1921.

== History ==
=== Revolt ===
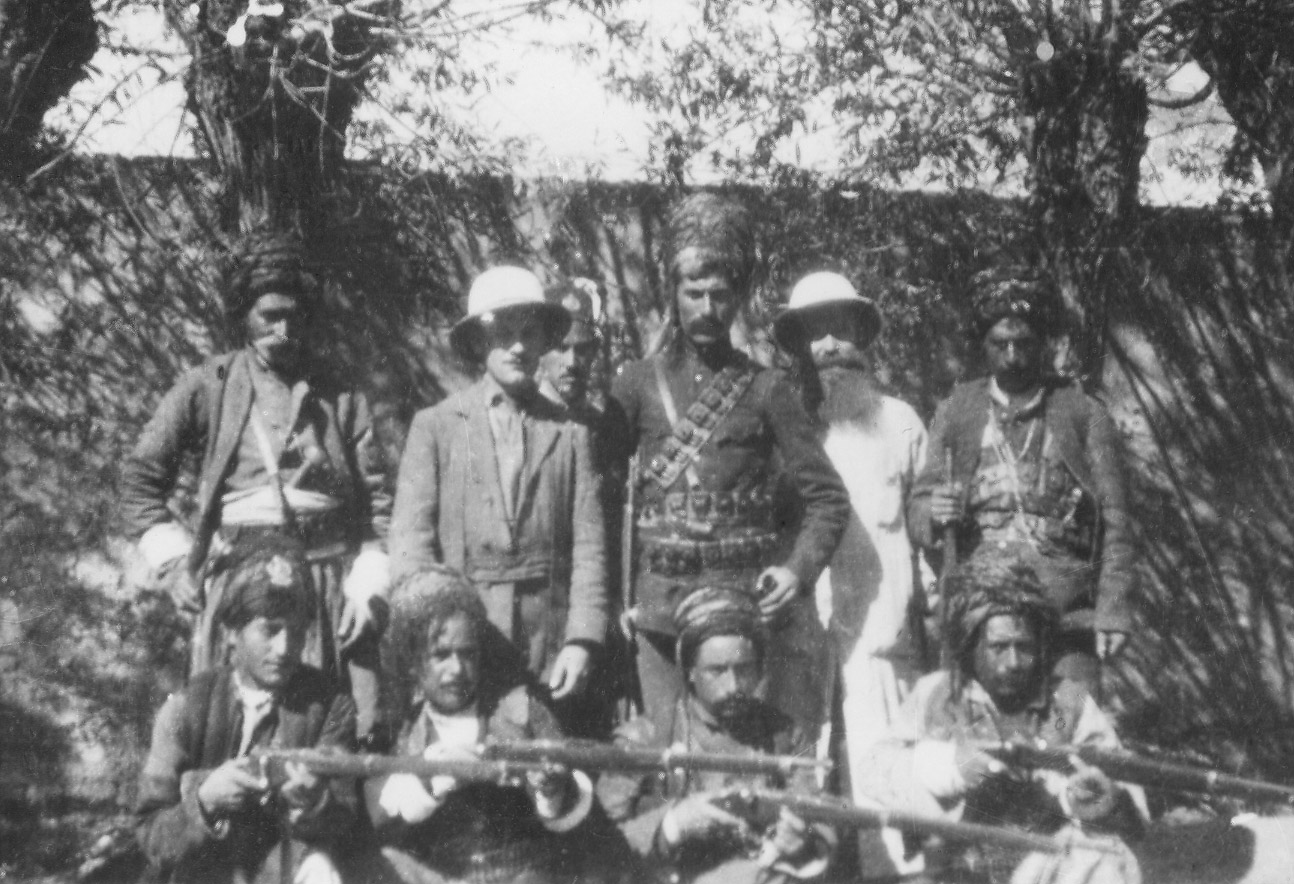
Simko (center)

By summer 1918, Simko had established his authority over the regions west of Lake Urmia. In 1919, Simko organized an army of 20,000 Kurds and managed to secure a self-governed area in northwestern Iran, centered in the city of Urmia. Simko's forces had been reinforced with several hundred soldiers and mercenaries from the Ottoman Empire, including Kurdish deserters and nationalists. After taking over Urmia, Simko appointed Teymur Agha Shikak as the governor of the city. Later, he organized his forces to fight the Iranian army in the region and managed to expand the area under his control to the nearby towns and cities such as Mahabad, Khoy, Miandoab, Maku and Piranshahr in a series of battles.

In March 1921, Simko defeated the Iranian army under Zafar al-Dowleh (later Brigadier General Hasan Muqaddam) at Tasuj, north of Lake Urmia.

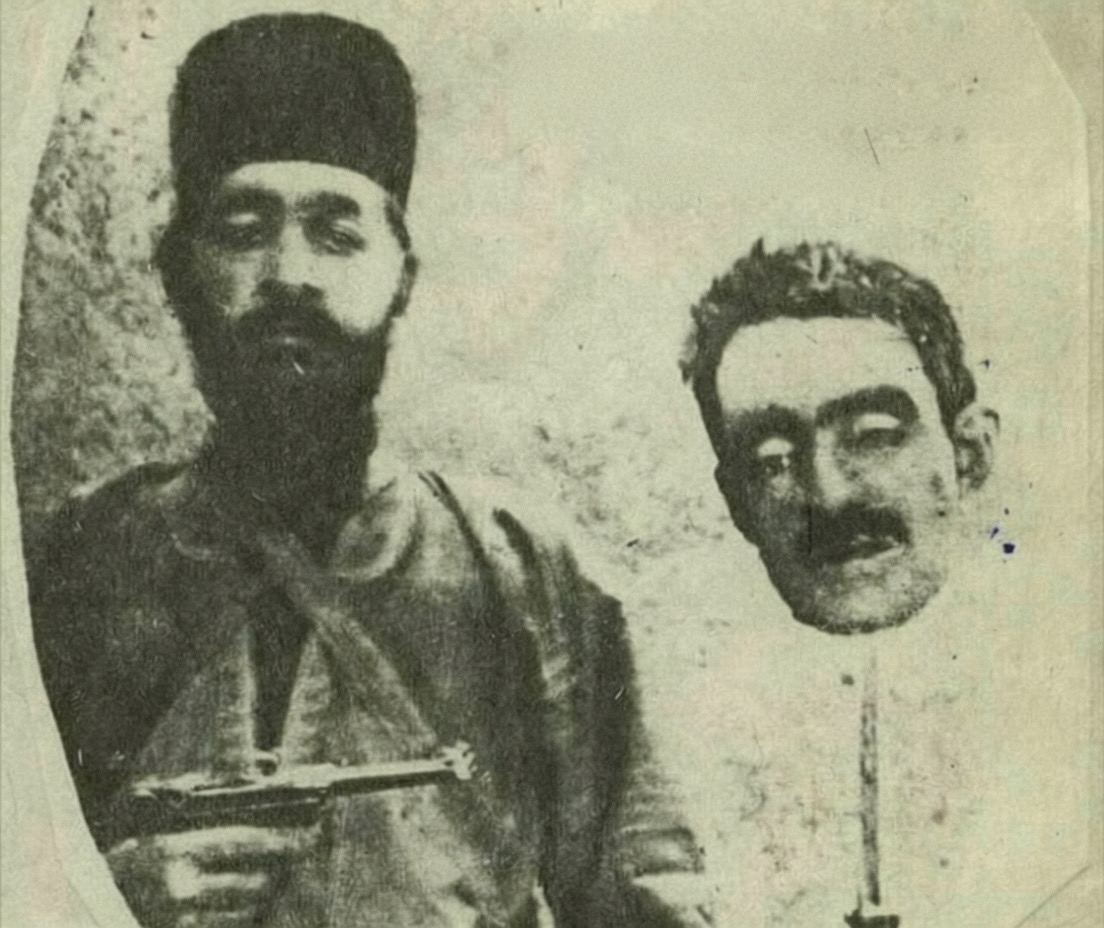
A Kurdish soldier standing beside the severed head of Mohammad Taqi Pessian.

In April 1921, a number of Khorasani Kurds led by Farajullah Khan revolted against Mohammad Taqi Pessian, 600 of the 1,000 Quchan gendarmerie were disarmed, thereby strengthening the power of the Kurdish insurgents. 3 October 1921, the Kurds killed Pessian in the vicinity of Jafarabad and then decapitated his corpse in Quchan. The Kurds also executed a number of gendarmerie forces, with between 12 and 100 people killed.

In September 1921, a detachment led by Hasan Arfa, which was reinforced from Tehran to Tabriz, was attacked by Simko and his 4,000 men. The detachment was completely defeated and half of the army died.

In the battle of Gulmakhana, Kurdish forces under the command of Simko Shikak took control over Gulmakhana and the Urmia-Tabriz road from Iranian forces. Simko ordered his advisor and commander-in-chief of the armed forces, Amar Khan Shikak, to attack the enemy forces. Amar Khan, along with an armed force and 200 warriors, destroyed enemy positions in the battle of Shekar Yazi and killed Amir Arshad. In the Battle of Sawcubilax, Reza Khan, dispatched Khaloo Qurban to counter Kurdish expansion, but he was defeated and killed by Simko's forces in 1922. In the battle for the conquest of Mahabad (then named Savoujbolagh Mokri), Simko himself commanded his forces with the help of Seyyed Taha Shamzini. After a tough battle in October 1921, Iranian forces were defeated and their commander Major Malakzadeh along with 600 Iranian Gendarmeries was killed. Simko also conquered Maragheh and encouraged the Lurs tribes of western Iran to revolt.

At this time, the government in Tehran tried to reach an agreement with Simko on the basis of limited Kurdish autonomy. Simko had further organized a Kurdish army, which grew stronger and stronger. Since the central government could not control his activities, he continued to expand the areas of western Iran under his control. By 1922, the cities of Baneh and Sardasht were under his administration.

In the battle of sari Taj in 1922, Simko's forces could not resist the Iranian Army's onslaught in the region of Salmas and were finally defeated and the castle of Chari, where Simko's forces were camping, was occupied. The strength of the Iranian Army force dispatched against Simko was 10,000 soldiers. Simko and one thousand of his mounted soldiers, took refuge in what was now Turkey, where they were forced to lay down their weapons.

=== Aftermath ===
By 1926, Simko had regained control of his tribe and begun another rebellion. When the army engaged him, half of his troops betrayed him to the tribe's previous leader and Simko fled to Iraq.

In 1930, the commander of the Iranian Army, General Hassan Muqaddam sent a letter to Simko, who was residing in the village of Barzan, and invited him for a meeting in the town of Oshnavieh. After consulting with his friends, Simko along with Khorshid Agha Harki went to Oshnaviyeh and were invited to the house of the local army commander, Colonel Norouzi, and were told to wait for the Iranian general. Colonel Norouzi convinced Simko to go to the outskirts of the town to welcome the general's arrival. However, this was a trap, and Simko was ambushed and killed on the evening of June 30, 1930.

== Allegations of foreign involvement ==
The Iranian government accused Britain and Iraq of encouraging unrest amongst the Kurds, and deeply resented the asylum given by the Iraqi government to Simko in 1922 and to Sardār Rashid in 1923.

There were British and Iranian suspicions that a large contingent loyal to Mustafa Kemal Atatürk had supported Simko, proof of those suspicions was never found. There were Kurdish nationalists from Turkey who joined Simko.

According to an article published by The New York Times on July 10, 1922:

It is said that Simko commanded 85,000 men and was assisted by Mustafa Kemal Pasha, former Turkish [Ottoman] War Minister, with the fighting lasting several days.

Simko's forces joined with the Ottoman forces in reportedly killing many of the escaping Christians in West Azerbaijan.

== Legacy ==
Simko's revolts are seen by some as an attempt by a powerful tribal chief to establish his personal authority over the central government throughout the region. Although elements of Kurdish nationalism were present in this movement, historians agree these were hardly articulate enough to justify a claim that recognition of Kurdish identity was a major issue in Simko's movement. It lacked any kind of administrative organization and Simko was primarily interested in plunder. Government forces and non-Kurds were not the only ones to suffer in the attacks, the Kurdish population was also robbed and assaulted. Simko's men do not appear to have felt any sense of unity or solidarity with fellow Kurds. In the words of Kurdologist and Iranologist Garnik Asatrian:

In the recent period of Kurdish history, a crucial point is defining the nature of the rebellions from the end of the 19th and up to the 20th century―from Sheikh Ubaydullah's revolt to Simko's (Simitko) mutiny. The overall labelling of these events as manifestations of the Kurdish national-liberation struggle against Turkish or Iranian suppressors is an essential element of the Kurdish identity-makers' ideology. (...) With the Kurdish conglomeration, as I said above, far from being a homogeneous entity―either ethnically, culturally, or linguistically (see above, fn. 5; also fn. 14 below)―the basic component of the national doctrine of the Kurdish identity-makers has always remained the idea of the unified image of one nation, endowed respectively with one language and one culture. The chimerical idea of this imagined unity has become further the fundament of Kurdish identity-making, resulting in the creation of fantastic ethnic and cultural prehistory, perversion of historical facts, falsification of linguistic data, etc. (for recent Western views on Kurdish identity, see Atabaki/Dorleijn 1990).

On the other hand, Reza Shah's military victory over Simko and Turkic tribal leaders initiated a repressive era toward non-Persian minorities. In a nationalistic perspective, Simko's revolt is described as an attempt to build a Kurdish tribal alliance in support of independence. According to the political scientist Hamid Ahmadi:

Though Reza Shah's armed confrontation with tribal leaders in different parts of Iran was interpreted as an example of ethnic conflict and ethnic suppression by the Iranian state, the fact is that it was more a conflict between the modern state and traditional socio-political structure of pre-modern era and had less to do with the question of ethnicity and ethnic conflict. While some Marxist political activists (see Nābdel 1977) and ethno-nationalist intellectuals of different Iranian groups (Ghassemlou 1965; Hosseinbor 1984; Asgharzadeh 2007) have introduced this confrontation as a result of Reza Shah's ethnocentric policies, no valid documents have been presented to prove this argument. Recent documentary studies (Borzū'ī 1999; Zand-Moqaddam 1992; Jalālī 2001) convincingly show that Reza Shah's confrontation with Baluch Dust Mohammad Khan, Kurdish Simko and Arab Sheikh Khaz'al have merely been the manifestation of state-tribe antagonism and nothing else. (...) While the Kurdish ethno-nationalist authors and commentators have tried to construct the image of a nationalist hero out of him, the local Kurdish primary sources reflect just the opposite, showing he was widely hated by many ordinary and peasant Kurds who suffered his brutal suppression of Kurdish settlements and villages.

== See also ==
- Timeline of Kurdish uprisings
- List of modern conflicts in the Middle East
- Luri tribal insurgency in Pahlavi Iran

== Sources ==
- Kia, Mehrdad (2023). The Clash of Empires and the Rise of Kurdish Proto-Nationalism, 1905–1926: Ismail Agha Simko and the Campaign for an Independent Kurdish State. Springer Nature. ISBN 978-3-031-44973-4.
