= Simko Shikak =

Kurdish leader (1887–1930)

Simko Shikak سمکۆی شکاک Simkoyê Şikak
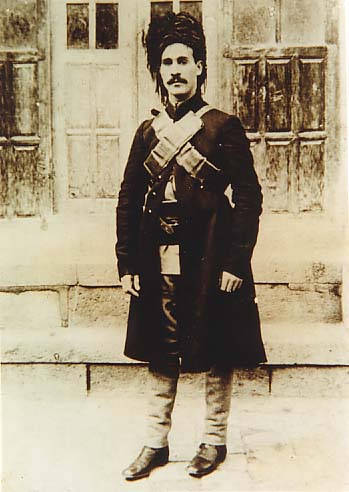
- Simko Shikak
- Born: 1887; Chahriq-e Olya, Qajar Iran
- Died: July 30, 1930 (aged 42–43); Oshnavieh, Pahlavi Iran
- Cause of death: Ambush
- Relatives: Amar Khan Shikak (uncle or cousin), Jafar Agha (older brother)
- Military career
- Conflicts: Ottoman invasion of Persia (1906); Bitlis uprising (1914); World War I; Persian campaign (World War I); Battle of Charah; Simko Shikak revolt (1918–1922); Lakestan incident; Battle of Shekar Yazi; Battle of Miandoab; Battle of Sawcubilax; Simko Shikak revolt (1926)

Signature
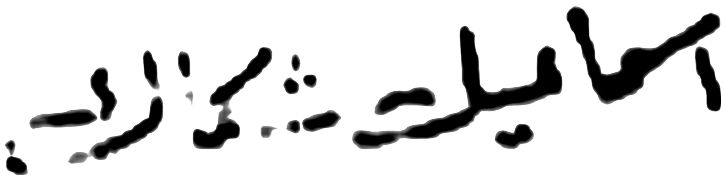

Ismail Agha Shikak (Kurdish: ئیسماعیل ئاغا شکاک, Îsmaîl Axayê Şikak), also known as Simko (Kurdish: سمکۆ, Simko; 1887–1930), was a Kurdish chieftain of the Shekak tribe. He was a warlord who controlled significant land and led thousands of Kurdish rebels who defeated the Qajar and Pahlavi armies on several occasions. He had also fought against the Ottomans and other foreign troops in Iran. He also led ethnic conflicts against Assyrians and Azerbaijanis. In 1930, he was assassinated by the government of Pahlavi Iran.

Opinions on Simko are divided. Some authors consider him a Kurdish nationalist, while others argue that he acted out of tribalism. Today, some Kurdish authors and commentators consider him the movement's founder and portray him as a nationalist hero. However, Kurdish sources from his time were hostile toward him for his violent suppression of Kurdish settlements.

== Early life ==
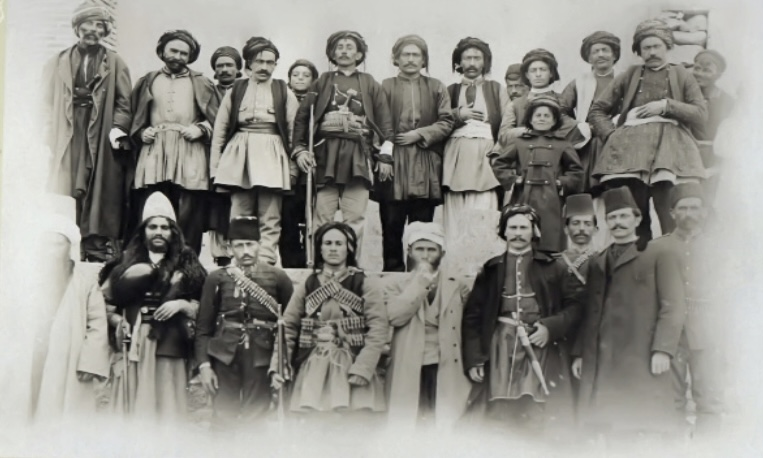
A young Simko Shikak

Simko was born in 1887 in Chahriq-e Olya, Chahriq Rural District, Salmas County, to Mohammad Agha Shikak, the son of Ismail Agha, who was the leader of the Awdoyi clan of the Shikak tribe. Ismail Agha died in 1816. The Shekak played a prominent role in local politics, occupying the districts of Somay, Baradost, Qotur, and Chahriq. His brother, Jafar Agha, later became leader of the tribe.

In spring 1905, the governor of Azerbaijan and crown prince Mohammad Ali Mirza (the future Mohammad Ali Shah Qajar) was summoned to Tehran. Meanwhile, Jafar Agha continued to pose a problem to the Iranian government by raiding the villages surrounding Khoy, Salmas and Urmia. The government responded by appointing Jafar Agha as the governor of Chahriq and its surroundings, expecting him to not attack rural areas now under his control. However, the surroundings of Salmas and Khoy were soon raided by him again. Hossein-Qoli Nezam al-Saltaneh Mafi subsequently invited Jafar Agha to Tabriz for negotiations, swearing on the Quran that he would not be harmed. When Jafar Agha reached Tabriz, he was killed by the men of Hossein-Qoli Nezam al-Saltaneh, who had received orders by Mohammad Ali Mirza to either imprison or kill him.

In 1907, his father, Mohammad Agha Shekak, went to personally ask Abdul Hamid II for revenge against Iran, although he was imprisoned in Istanbul and died in prison.

== Career ==
=== Family and connections ===
Simko became the leader of the Shekak tribe in 1905 after the death of his elder brother Jafar Agha.

Simko was married to the daughter of Seyyed Taha, the grandson of Sheikh Ubeydullah, who was also a Kurdish nationalist who was actively campaigning for the unification of Iranian Kurdistan and Turkish Kurdistan in an independent state.

Kurdish nationalism was first introduced to Iranian Kurds during the reign of Abdul Hamid II, where the Ottoman Empire made several attempts to annex Iranian Kurdistan while encouraging nationalism to convince Iranian Kurds to the rest of the Kurds, who lived in the Ottoman Empire.

=== Early political alignments and Russian ties ===
The Young Turk Revolution did not change the policy. The Ottomans briefly controlled Iranian Kurdistan on two occasions, in 1906 and World War I.

In 1906, the Ottomans captured Mahabad relatively easily due to the Kurds being Sunni. In 1908, a group of Kurdish nationalists approached the Russian consulate in Urmia and asked for assistance in expelling the Ottomans. Simko was the most prominent figure who approached the consulate. The presence of Ottoman troops in Iranian Kurdistan had challenged the powerful status of Simko, while the Kurds were divided into Pro-Ottoman and Anti-Ottoman factions. Simko visited the Russian consulate in Urmia again in 1911 and visited Russia in 1912. Simko attacked the Ottomans and caused significant damage. Illarion Vorontsov-Dashkov often gave Simko rank promotions, which the Ottomans protested to Sergey Sazonov, but achieved nothing as the Russian consul in Van stated that Simko "is someone that we need and we should support him, since his hatred toward the Turks is without limit. And that benefits us." In the Persian Constitutional Revolution, Simko turned against the Constitutionalists, who were largely urban Azeris, and without being invited, sent 300 horsemen to join Iqbal al-Saltaneh, the governor of Maku, against the anjuman of Khoy. Simko was rewarded with the position of sub-governor of Qotur District, which the central government confirmed despite Simko's constant raids.

=== Educational and cultural initiatives ===
Prior to 1913, Simko sided with pro-Ottoman and anti-Russian Azerbaijanis, although he delivered one of them, who sought refuge with him, to Russia in 1913, after which the Russians convinced the other Shikak leaders to pledge allegiance to Simko. In 1913, Simko and Abdurrezak Bedirkhan established the first Kurdish school in Iran in Maku and asked the Russian Vice-Consul Chirkov in Urmia for support, which he gave. Simko gathered 29 children aged between 8 and 10, and assigned 40 of his men as guards. Simko had personally handwritten a letter of gratitude to the Russian Czar.

In 1914, they attempted to open another school in Khoy but were opposed by the Iranian government. Abdurrezak Bedirkhan notably supported the Cyrillicisation of the Kurdish alphabet and saw Russian influence as better than Arabic, Turkish, or Persian. Simko and Bedirkhan fell out after Bedirkhan wanted to turn the newly established cultural house into an anti-Ottoman pro-Russian political party, with Simko opposing, claiming that killing a few Ottoman soldiers would not benefit the Kurds as much as the school would. In March 1914, Simko Shikak participated in the Bitlis uprising against the Ottomans, having sent support westwards to the Kurdish rebels. In May 1914, he attended a meeting with Abdürrezzak Bedir Khan.

=== World War I and shifting alliances ===
Simko claimed that "only a fool" could not see the need for foreign support for the Kurdish nationalist movement. In World War I, the Russians were expelled from the region after the Ottomans captured Urmia and Tabriz in December 1914. Simko then became an Ottoman ally and massacred hundreds of Armenians and Assyrians. However, when the Ottomans requested help against the British, Simko refused. The Russians returned shortly after and briefly imprisoned Simko in Tbilisi, after which he returned to Iran, again a Russian ally. An anti-Ottoman alliance was pursued by British military and intelligence officers in coordination with Simko following the end of the Russian military presence in Iran in 1917. He frequently changed sides as he was willing to ally with anyone who benefitted the Kurds. However, Simko was paranoid and believed that the Assyrians wanted to establish a state in Kurdish lands and ethnically cleanse the Kurds.

The potential for an alliance with the British did not last long, as Simko invited Shimun XIX Benyamin, the secular and religious leader of the Assyrians, for negotiations in March 1918, where Mar Shimun and the majority of his delegation were killed and butchered. Simko sided with the Ottomans when they invaded Iran in summer 1918. Several historians, as well as Lady Surma, the sister or Mar Shimun, claimed that the Iranian government had organized the assassination of Mar Shimun, with Simko only having acted as the executioner. Others claimed that the Ottomans had paid him to kill Mar Shimun. However, there is no evidence that support these claims.

=== Post-World War I activities ===
Jointly with the Ottoman Army, Simko organized the massacre in Haftevan in February 1915 during which 700–800 Armenians and Assyrians were killed.

During the Ottoman withdrawal from the South Caucasus after World War I, many ethnic Kurdish soldiers and officers deserted from the Ottoman army and joined Simko, inspired by his nationalist goals. Despite deserting, they had brought the Ottoman equipment with them to Iran. They were paid generously by Simko and formed the bulk of the Kurdish rebels in Iran.

=== Regional geopolitics and foreign contacts ===
According to Armenian sources, Simko and Seyyid Taha were in contact with the British and with Turkish nationalists in May 1919. The Turkish nationalists had mainly wanted Simko to block the proposed repatriation of Armenians to western Armenia, promising support in return. In a letter to the British consul-general of Tabriz, Simko denied the claims of the Armenian sources that he sought Turkish support. There were British and Iranian suspicions that a large contingent loyal to Mustafa Kemal Atatürk had supported Simko, proof of those suspicions was never found. There were Kurdish nationalists from Turkey who joined Simko.

=== Ideology, nationalism, and historical legacy ===
According to British travelogue CJ Edmonds who interviewed Simko in 1922, Simko hated Turks more than Persians.

Flag used during the Simko Shikak revolt, as referenced in his newspaper Kurd. The upper inscription is a Quranic verse, and the central text reads "کردستان سربخوە" (lit. 'Independent Kurdistan').

In 1918, the Simko Shikak revolt began, aimed at establishing an independent Kurdish state. Nearing the 1920s, Simko grew increasingly nationalist. However, Simko was primarily considered a tribal leader, as he lived in a time when Kurds primarily gave their allegiance to their tribe and had no concept of unity for a national cause. Simko lacked administration, which made him less successful than his contemporaries Mohammad Khiabani and Mirza Kuchik Khan. Simko was a pioneer of Kurdish nationalism and was among the first to attempt to unite Kurds of various tribal affiliation for a national cause. His failure was primarily due to the lack of nationalism among Kurds. However, Kurdish nationalism rapidly grew during the Pahlavi era in Iran, which also coincided with the Kemalist era in Turkey where Kurdish nationalism was also growing. Eventually, Qazi Muhammad successfully united various Kurdish tribes and established the Republic of Mahabad. Qazi Muhammad's father was a close friend of Simko and accompanied him throughout the battles. Before the Republic of Mahabad, Simko had made Mahabad his capital. Many of the veterans of the Simko Shikak revolt participated in the Republic of Mahabad, including Amar Khan Shikak who succeeded Simko as tribe leader.

=== Defeat at Charah and assassination attempt ===
During the Battle of Charah, following the murder of Mar Shimun, the Assyrians under the command of Agha Petros and Malik Khoshaba attacked the fortress in Charah, in which Simko was decisively defeated and fled to Khoy.

The deputy governor of Azerbaijan, Mokarram-ol-Molk, devised a plan to assassinate Simko with a gift box that had a bomb inside. In May 1919, the bomb was assembled by an Armenian expert in Khoy and sent to Simko disguised as a package of confections. When the package reached Simko, his young son brought it inside, believing it was a gift. Simko immediately knew what it was and threw it far away as he tightly grabbed his son and got on the floor. They both survived, although the bombing killed Simko's younger brother, Ali Agha Shikak, as well as many Kurdish troops.

Simko vowed revenge and began taxing non-Kurds living between Salmas and Khoy and intensifying the attacks on Assyrian and Azerbaijani communities. Simko demanded that whoever sent the package be handed over. Although Mokarram-ol-Molk was the one who planned it, he blamed it on three people who had no part in it but were disliked by both the Iranian government and Simko. One of the accused men was Jahangir Mirza, a Qajar prince who owned many schools in Khoy. One of the schools, named Cyrus, was captured by Simko after he killed Mar Shimun. Simko lived in the school for a period of time, and on one occasion, Jahangir Mirza attempted to evict Simko from the school but failed. Simko felt humiliated and continued to hold resentment. In June, the three men were escorted to Simko by thirteen Qaradaghi tribesmen. The three men and all the Qaradaghi tribesmen had their limbs cut off and were thrown from the roof of Simko's palace. He targeted the Qaradaghi tribesmen as revenge for his brother Jafar Agha, who was killed by a Qaradaghi chief in 1905.

=== Territorial expansion and governance ===
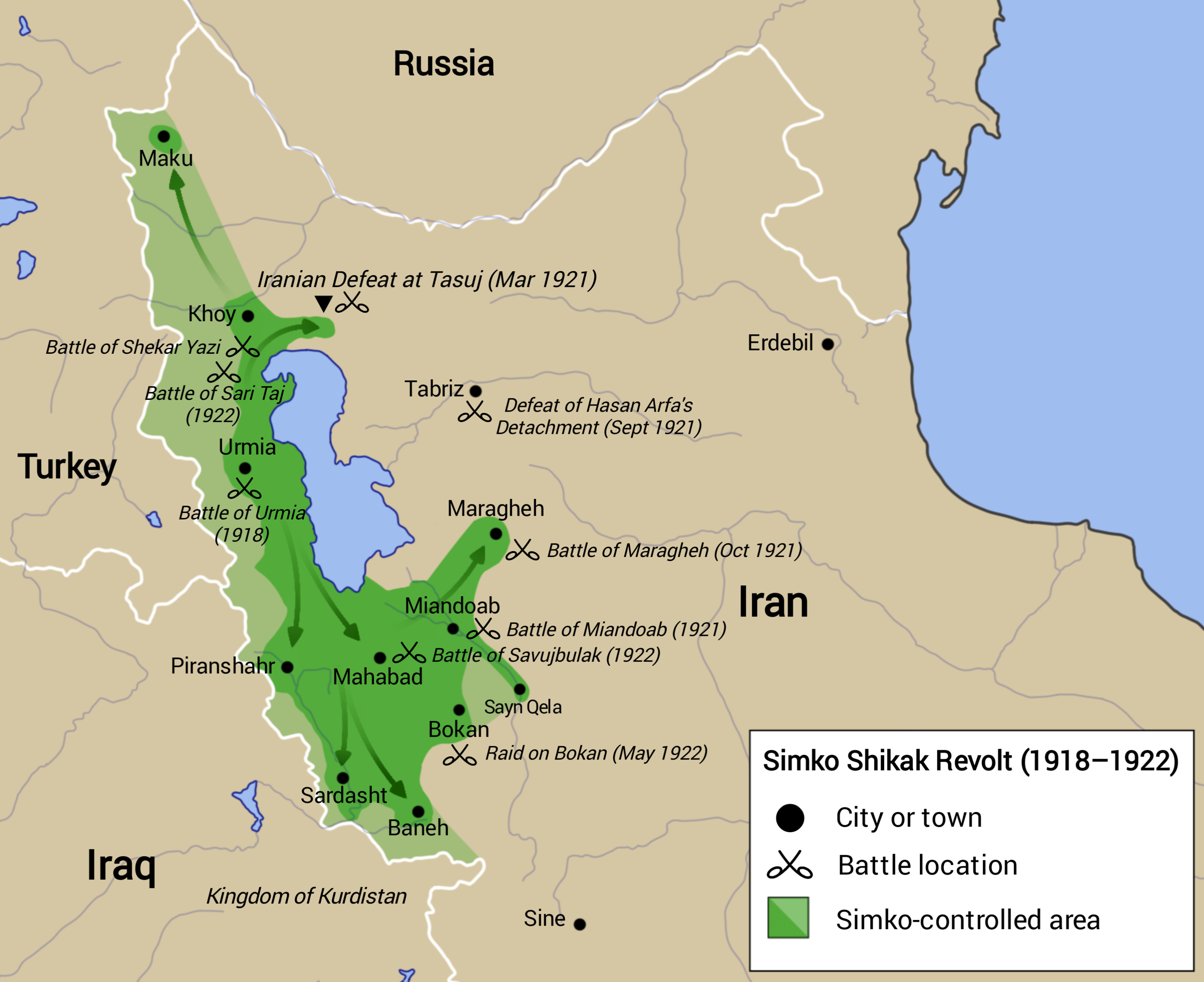
Map showing the main locations and zones controlled by Simko Shikak during his revolt (1918–1922).

By summer 1918, Simko had established his authority in the region west of Lake Urmia. In 1919, Simko sent a letter to the British civil commissioner of Iraq, demanding Kurdish independence. Also in 1919, Yusuf Adl Mukarram ul-Molk, the governor of Iranian Azerbaijan, devised a plot to kill Simko by sending him a present with a bomb hidden in it. At this time, government in Tehran tried to reach an agreement with Simko on the basis of limited Kurdish autonomy. Simko and his tribe, well known as robbers and plunderers, specifically targeted Assyrian and Azerbaijani communities. Simko Shikak and his elder brother Jafar Agha did not loot indiscriminately, as the poor Kurds tended to have positive views of them, whereas the Assyrians and Azerbaijanis feared them. In 1919, Simko gave refuge to the family of Mahmud Barzinji when they fled to Iran.

In December 1919, the multi-ethnic parts of West Azerbaijan province were extremely dangerous and riddled with ethnic violence. The cities of Salmas, Urmia, and Khoy, all made up of Kurds, Azerbaijanis, and Assyrians, saw the worst of tensions. The Kurds had the advantage, and there were telegrams of pleas from Azerbaijanis and Assyrians who grew increasingly worried. Later, Simko Shikak announced his planned invasion of Lakestan, namely Soltan Ahmad and Qarah Qeshlaq, both of which were inhabited entirely by ethnic Azerbaijanis. Lakestan is near Salmas, and its residents were either cattle breeders, farmers, or chiefs. In Lakestan, around 8,700 Azerbaijani locals prepared to confront Simko, although over 340 did not have weapons. Simko had nearly 4,000 Kurdish soldiers. On Friday, 19 December, the Kurds besieged the area, and the fighting lasted for two hours before the Kurds entered the city from all sides and began looting and pillaging. In the telegram that survivors of Lakestan sent to Tabriz, they claimed that 3,500 Azerbaijanis had died, with 2,000 of them being directly killed by Simko and the other 1,500 of them being frozen to death while trying to escape. The events created a strong shock in Tabriz.

The Iranian Army later deployed to Lakestan and retook the region. In nearby settlements, during and after the Lakestan massacres, Kurds clashed with Azerbaijanis and Assyrians. Iran later reached a deal with Simko to stop his attacks, although he began attacking again shortly after. Immediately after, Simko led the invasion of Urmia, where the Kurds captured the city and massacred Assyrians and Azerbaijanis. The Afshar tribe submitted to Simko Shikak and his authority.

In 1920, Simko told an American missionary "here I am living at the top of my mountain, my people eating grass, and no one about us but the false Russians, the false Turks and the false Persians. How can my voice reach Paris? You must carry my appeal. We need help and we look especially to America."

On October 7, 1921, Simko led the invasion of Mahabad, where 200 Iranian soldiers were killed and 150 were injured, and the city fell under Kurdish control. Afterwards, Simko's men entered the hospitals in the city and cut the throats of the wounded Iranian soldiers seeking treatment. Simko then advanced towards Iranian forces led by Qaradaghi tribe leader Amir Arshad. After the humiliation at Mahabad, the Iranian prime minister, Qavam al-Saltaneh, had ordered the governor of Azerbaijan to support Amir Arshad, also known as Sam Khan, who was a Qaradaghi tribal leader of the Hajialilu tribe, as the commander of a new force created to defeat Simko. In autumn 1920, the Hajialilu tribe gave refuge to Armenian fighters fleeing the Ottoman Empire, significantly increasing the weaponry of Amir Arshad. The Iranian government aimed to use a "loyal" tribal leader to fight a "disloyal" one. By late October 1921, the Qaradaghi tribesmen and the Iranian gendarmerie were at Sharafkhaneh and Khoy, respectively, and planned to push towards Salmas, the stronghold of Simko. However, Simko was aware, and had actually surprised Amir Arshad in Alma Saray, Tasuj. The Qaradaghi tribesmen were stunned and instantly fled, losing 200 men. Amir Arshad himself had panicked and fled before being killed by his own fighters. After defeating the Qaradaghi tribesmen, Simko defeated the Iranian gendarmerie led by Swedish Colonel Lundberg, which retreated to Khoy. Immediately after, Simko and the Turkish government cut ties and armed clashes broke out between them.

The authority of Simko was recognized by a growing amount of Kurdish tribes. In addition to the Shikak, Simko was supported by the Herki, Mamash, Mangur, Dehbokri, Piran, Zarza, Gewrik, Feyzullabegi, Pizhdar, and the smaller tribes around Baneh. He was also supported by tribes in Hawraman and even Luristan. His authority was centered in Mahabad, although he did not live there, and his stronghold was his hometown of Chehriq. When he captured Mahabad in 1921, his fighters looted and pillaged the city. Unlike in Dilman or Urmia earlier, the victims in Mahabad were Kurds. Furthermore, American missionaries were also robbed and killed. The Kurdish victims were robbed but generally left alive, whereas the Azerbaijani victims were killed without exception. After capturing Mahabad, Simko added "Partisan of the Independence of Kurdistan" to his signature and began publishing a newspaper in Kurdish and Persian. It was unknown whether the newspaper was called Kurd or Independent Kurdistan. He made Mahabad his capital. Afterwards, the Iranian government captured the city until Simko captured it again. Control over the city repeatedly changed until the Iranian government captured it in August 1922.

=== Defeat at Sari Taj and aftermath ===
Simko had organized a strong Kurdish army which was much stronger than Iranian government forces. Since the central government could not control his activities, he continued to expand the area under his control and by 1922, cities of Baneh and Sardasht were under his administration. In the Battle of Sari Taj in 1922, Simko's forces could not resist the Iranian Army's onslaught in the region of Salmas and were finally defeated and the castle of Chari was occupied. The strength of the Iranian Army force dispatched against Simko was 10,000 soldiers. In 1922, Turkey assisted the Iranian army against Simko.

=== Exile and Kurdish diplomacy ===
After the defeat of Simko, Reza Shah began a repressive campaign toward non-Persian minorities.

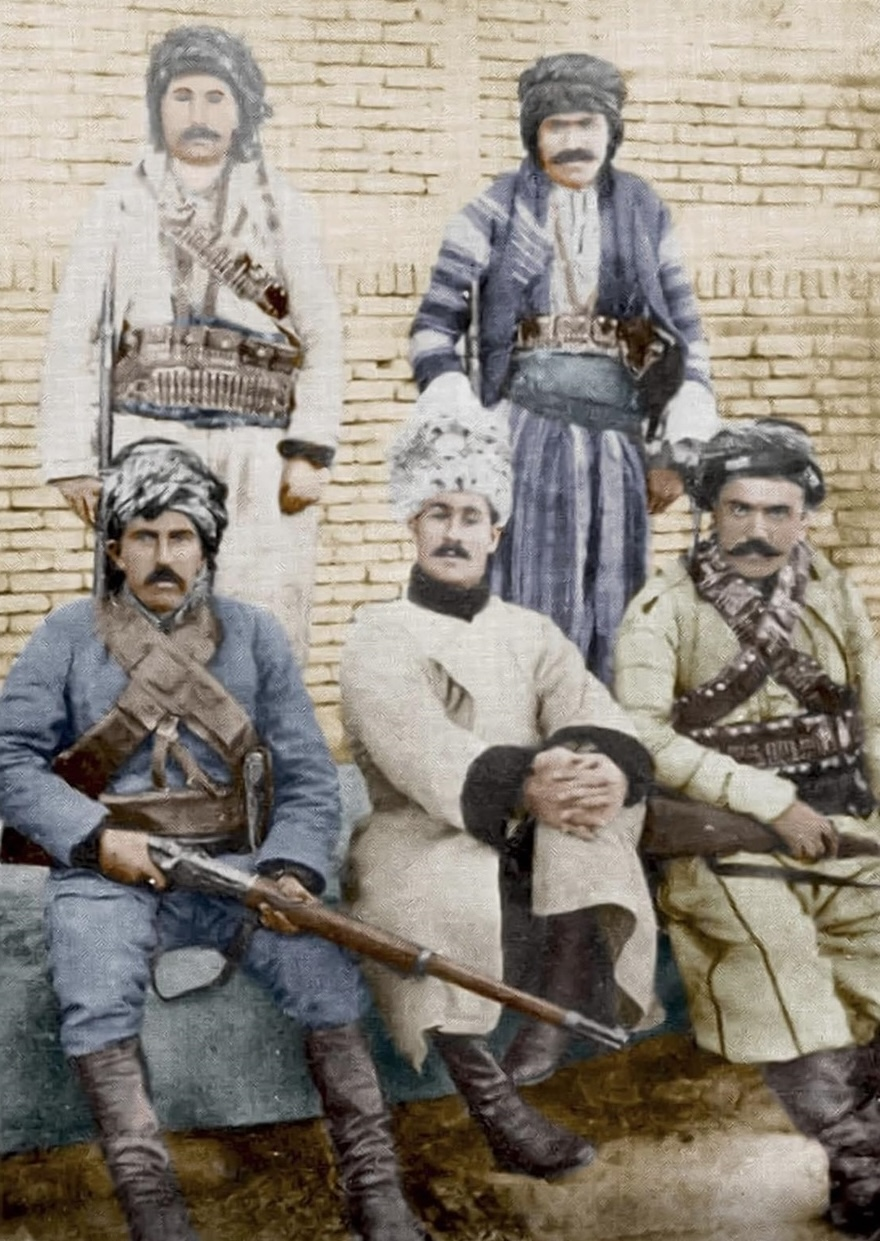
Simko and his men in Sulaymaniyah to meet Mahmud Barzanji

Simko was in regular contact with Kurdish nationalist circles, especially after his alliance with the Russians. On January 8, 1923, Simko, whom the local press had already celebrated as "the champion of Kurdistan," arrived in Sulaymaniyah to pay a visit to Mahmud Barzanji. He was given a ceremony, including "a parade of troops, a salute of seven guns" Although no agreement was reached between the two.

After Reza Khan came to power in 1921, he began a campaign against Simko and all other tribal leaders across Iran. By 1924, Simko, severely weakened, had surrendered and was pardoned by Reza Khan. When Reza Khan became Reza Shah in 1925, Simko pledged eternal loyalty to him and the Iranian state. Turkey was concerned about Simko joining the Sheikh Said revolt with Iranian support. When Simko captured Miandoab and Sayinqaleh, he boosted the morale of the Kurdish tribes, who began joining him in large numbers, and he called on the Lurs to join the revolt as well. Several Luri tribes did connect with Simko. Reza Shah initially was unable to suppress the Lurs due to the intensity of the war against Simko. In spring 1922, when Simko was defeated, Reza Shah led a bloody campaign against the Lur tribes which supported Simko, and initially failed, although he subdued them by summer. After Simko was defeated in 1922 and fled to Iraq, the Kurdish and Luri tribes which supported Simko were deported to other parts of Iran.

In 1926, Simko allied with the Herki and Begzada tribes, regained leadership of the Shekak tribe, and began another revolt. Shortly after, Iranian forces were dispatched from Urmia, Sharafkhaneh and Khoy, and defeated Simko. Simko fled to the Turkish frontier where he was arrested. After his release, he returned to Iran. Simko, having lost much power and influence, took minor part in the 1928-1929 revolt led by Mullah Khalil of the Mangur tribe in Mahabad against Reza Shah, which had Kurdish nationalist motives and was triggered by Reza Shah banning the hijab. The revolt was suppressed. It was known that Simko died in Oshnaviyeh on June 21, 1930, although there were two conflicting reports, with one claiming that he was killed in battle with Iranian forces, and another claiming that he was killed unsuspectingly as he was sitting with Iranian officials in negotiations, similarly to how his brother Jafar Agha was killed.

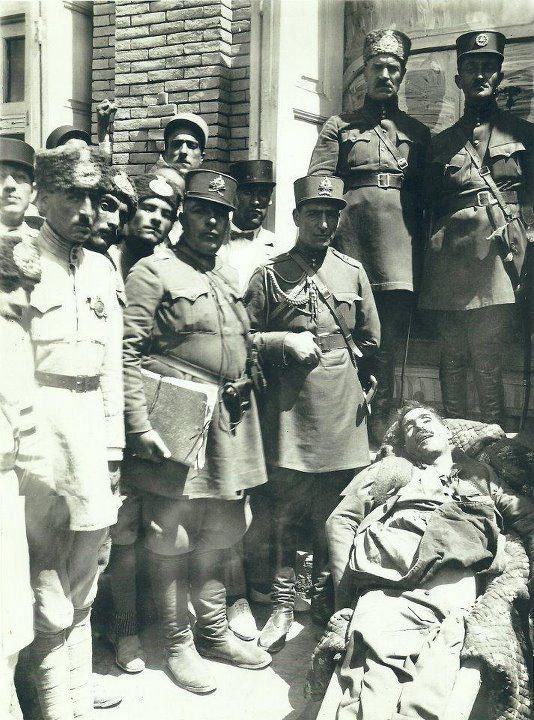
A Persian Cossack Brigade soldiers with the corpse of Simko Shikak

== Legacy ==
Simko's revolts are seen by some as an attempt by a powerful tribal chief to establish his personal authority over the central government throughout the region. Ideologically, he was staunchly nationalist and supported the establishment of a united and independent Kurdish state. Simko was primarily interested in plunder and often lacked administrative organization. The French journalist and researcher Chris Kutschera claimed that Kurds generally spoke negatively about Simko, a view regarded as justified by the political scientist Abbas Manafy, while some prominent Kurdish figures nevertheless considered him the founder of Kurdish nationalism. Simko's actions gave the Kurds a bad reputation for being looters, robbers, and killers. According to Manafy, Simko was manipulated by the Russians and the British as a means to secure oil concessions from Iran, while his struggle did not follow any clear revolutionary ideology and conflicted with national liberation movements that opposed major colonial powers, making him more of an agent to carry out foreign imperial objectives rather than promoting genuine freedom, and he did not even see the basic indications that the British and Russians were only taking advantage of him.

Islamic historian Kamal Soleimani claimed that Simko was indeed a Kurdish nationalist, born in a region fraught with ethnic and religious tensions, and was well aware of the politics of the region. Soleimani questioned why a regular tribe leader would take part in establishing the first Kurdish school in Iran, make Kurdish the official language in the area he controlled, and wrote a Kurdish newspaper, adding that Simko could have used Persian as Kurdish was not standardized and its literacy rate was far worse than that of Persian. Soleimani stated that Simko's actions being motivated by Kurdish nationalism did not make them ethical, but nevertheless still nationalist.

Soleimani added that critics of Simko very often painted him as a tribal leader with no nationalist aspirations, which he claimed originated from the Pahlavi government and Iranian state historiography painting all tribal based revolts across Iran as merely tribal revolts with personal motives, to delegitimize the revolts. He also added that Iranian historians almost without exception mirrored the official state narrative and avoided using firsthand sources from Kurds. He stated that Simko himself made Kurdish nationalist statements and that Hasan Arfa, the Iranian head of military intelligence who led most of the campaign against Simko, himself confirmed that the fight against Simko was beyond tribal. Soleimani claimed that at the cost of human suffering, Simko helped bolster Kurdish nationalism in Iran, linking its effects to the Republic of Mahabad established shortly after. Soleimani also claimed that in addition to denying the Kurdish nationalism of Simko, the Iranian narrative also painted Simko as "uneducated". Soleimani cited allies and enemies of Simko who described him as intelligent, and added that in addition to various Kurdish dialects, Simko spoke Persian, Azeri, and Russian, and that he had a piano in his house which he learned to play in Russia, and also enjoyed theatre and cinema. Soleimani claimed that Ahmad Kasravi criticized the "uneducated" Simko for seeking a Kurdish state, yet did not question the nationalism of Reza Shah who was also reported to have lacked a formal education.

According to the British anthropologist Richard Tapper, by 1913 Simko had both nationalist and personal goals which were inseparable. He notes that many contemporary and later Kurdish nationalists criticized Simko for his constant plundering. He suggests that the plundering "probably was a necessary condition for keeping the tribes mobilised and thus together. When mobilisation ended - in this case because most tribesmen judged the chances of further success very small and therefore gave up - the unity immediately broke down."

According to the Iranian American historian Mehrdad Kia:

There is no evidence to suggest that Simko's opposition to the Iranian state was based on some form of cultural nationalism, but there is ample evidence to argue that he viewed the centralizing policies of the Iranian government, especially after the creation of a modern standing army, as a direct threat to his political and economic privileges. His reaction to the policies of the government in Tehran was, therefore, the reaction of a feudal lord and a tribal chief rather than the response of a Kurdish nationalist intellectual worried about the loss of his/her cultural and linguistic identity. His complaints about the Iranian government's policies focused on the erosion of power for himself and other chiefs to run their territories as autonomous potentates; such complaints were rarely directed at the lack of democracy or human, cultural, and linguistic rights. Simko's scattered and inconsistent appeal to Kurdish nationalism lacked a commitment to a program of improvement for Kurdish life in Iran. Rather, it was for the most part, a tactical ploy to rally the neighboring Kurdish tribes around a unified flag.

In the words of Armenian Kurdologist and Iranologist Garnik Asatrian:

In the recent period of Kurdish history, a crucial point is defining the nature of the rebellions from the end of the 19th and up to the 20th century―from Sheikh Ubaydullah's revolt to Simko's (Simitko) mutiny. The overall labelling of these events as manifestations of the Kurdish national-liberation struggle against Turkish or Iranian suppressors is an essential element of the Kurdish identity-makers' ideology. (...) With the Kurdish conglomeration, as I said above, far from being a homogeneous entity―either ethnically, culturally, or linguistically (...)―the basic component of the national doctrine of the Kurdish identity-makers has always remained the idea of the unified image of one nation, endowed respectively with one language and one culture. The chimerical idea of this imagined unity has become further the fundament of Kurdish identity-making, resulting in the creation of fantastic ethnic and cultural prehistory, perversion of historical facts, falsification of linguistic data, etc.

On the other hand, Reza Shah's military victory over Simko and Turkic tribal leaders initiated a repressive era toward non-Persian minorities. In a nationalistic perspective, Simko's revolt is described as an attempt to build a Kurdish tribal alliance in support of independence. According to Kamal Soleimani, Simko Shikak can be located "within the confines of Kurdish ethno-nationalism". According to the political scientist Hamid Ahmadi:

Though Reza Shah's armed confrontation with tribal leaders in different parts of Iran was interpreted as an example of ethnic conflict and ethnic suppression by the Iranian state, the fact is that it was more a conflict between the modern state and traditional socio-political structure of pre-modern era and had less to do with the question of ethnicity and ethnic conflict. While some Marxist political activists (see Nābdel 1977) and ethno-nationalist intellectuals of different Iranian groups (Ghassemlou 1965; Hosseinbor 1984; Asgharzadeh 2007) have introduced this confrontation as a result of Reza Shah's ethnocentric policies, no valid documents have been presented to prove this argument. Recent documentary studies (Borzū'ī 1999; Zand-Moqaddam 1992; Jalālī 2001) convincingly show that Reza Shah's confrontation with Baluch Dust Mohammad Khan, Kurdish Simko and Arab Sheikh Khaz'al have merely been the manifestation of state-tribe antagonism and nothing else. (...) While the Kurdish ethno-nationalist authors and commentators have tried to construct the image of a nationalist hero out of him, the local Kurdish primary sources reflect just the opposite, showing he was widely hated by many ordinary and peasant Kurds who suffered his brutal suppression of Kurdish settlements and villages.

== See also ==
- Mar Shimun XIX Benyamin
- Persian campaign (World War I)
- Simko Shikak revolt (1918–1922)
