= Battle of Charah =

Battle during World War I

Battle of Charah (1918)
- Part of Persian campaign (World War I)
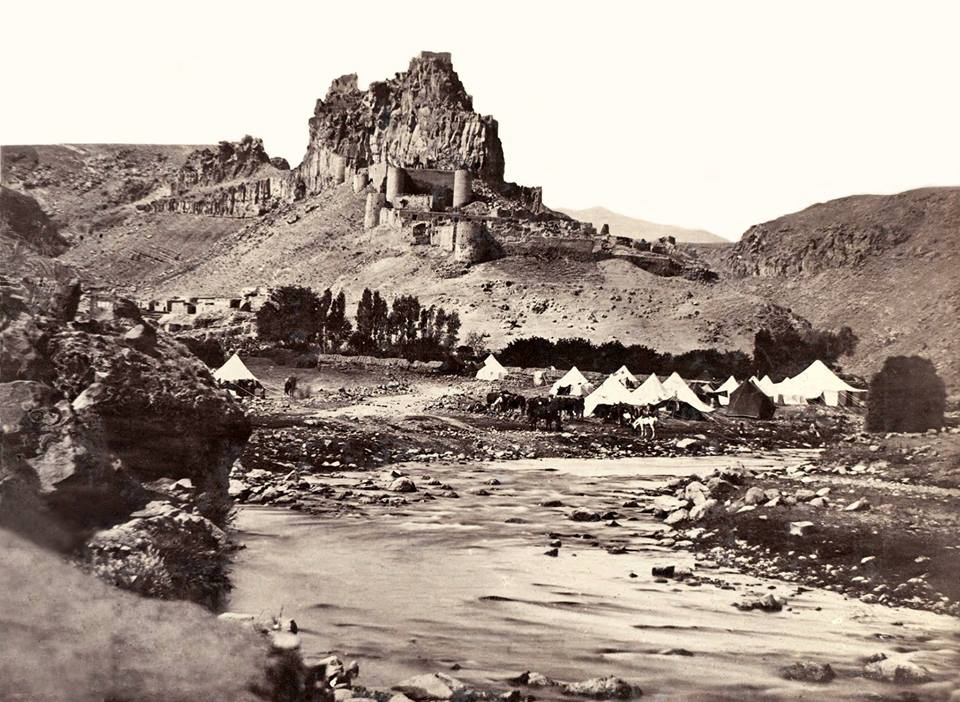
- The fortress of Charah and its surroundings
Date	16 March, 1918 - 17 March, 1918 (36 hours)
Location	Salmas, Chahriq, Persia
Result	Assyrian victory: Simko fled to Khoy; Charah was sacked and looted

Belligerents
Assyrian volunteers	Shekak tribe

Commanders and leaders
Agha Petros; Malik Khoshaba; Dawid Mar Shimun; Count Cozmin	Simko Shikak (WIA)

Strength
c.3,000-7,000 (Note: Anahit Khosroeva gives an estimate of 7,000 "mountain dwellers", whereas Hasan Arfa claims that a detachment of 3,000 proceeded to Charah.)	Unknown

Casualties and losses
48	Heavy

The Battle of Charah (Note: Also known as Chehriq, Chahriq, Chara, Chari) took place on 16-17 March 1918, around the stronghold of Chahriq between the Assyrian volunteers led by general Agha Petros and the Russian officer Count Cozmin, against Shekak tribesmen led by the Kurdish tribal leader Simko Shikak, who was responsible for the assassination of the Assyrian patriarch Shimun XIX Benyamin.

== Background ==
On 3 March 1918, the Assyrian patriarch Mar Shimun and most of his 150 bodyguards were assassinated by Simko Shikak, a Kurdish tribal leader, in the town of Kuhnashahir, Salmas under a truce flag. Upon receiving the news of the assassination, the Assyrians massacred 500 Kurdish refugees in an Anti-Kurdish pogrom in the city of Urmia. Some sources estimate that perhaps 10,000 Kurds and Azerbaijani Turks were killed at the hands of the Assyrians during this period of instability.

== Battle ==
=== Prelude ===
Following the death of the patriarch Mar Shimun, general Agha Petros mobilized an army comprising two columns to pursue Simko Shikak. According to Anahit Khosroeva, the army led by Agha Petros constituted of 7,000 "mountain-dwellers". Hasan Arfa, meanwhile, stated that a detachment of approximately 3,000 was first dispatched to the city of Kuhnashahir, where the Assyrians looted the town and killed "scores of innocent non-Kurdish Azeris" before proceeding to Charah.

The organized Assyrian force marched over the districts of Brodosnai and Somai, defeating Simko's outposts in multiple small-scale engagements.

=== Attack on Charah ===
On 16 March 1918, the Assyrian force led by Agha Petros and the Russian officer Count Cozmin, accompanied by Dawid Mar Shimun and Malik Khoshaba among others, launched an attack on the fortress of Charah.

Simko had briefly allied himself with local Azerbaijani forces; the governor-general of Iranian Azerbaijan subsequently assembled all the available troops and stationed them on the outskirts of Charah to protect Simko. However, when the Assyrians arrived in Charah, the troops were absent, leading Simko to suspect that he had been betrayed.

After 36 hours of fighting, Simko was defeated, and many of his people were killed. However, realizing that he could no longer resist the attack, Simko managed to escape with roughly 500 followers to the city of Khoy before the fortress was sacked and looted.

Malik Yaqo, an Assyrian military officer who witnessed the events, recounted that parts of the river in Charah were turning red from the blood of human and animal corpses, and that the number of dead Assyrians reached 48.

== Aftermath ==
The Charah fortress was captured, while Simko's mother and niece, the daughter of Jafar Agha, were reportedly captured by the victorious Assyrian force and later taken to Urmia. As the fortress was sacked and looted, the Assyrians discovered several documents and letters from Persian officials, including the governor of Iranian Azerbaijan, inciting Simko to rise up against the Christians and assassinate Mar Shimun.

In order to compensate for their failure in capturing Simko, the Assyrians burnt down Kurdish villages in the region and killed the inhabitants. The chain of events seriously damaged Assyrian national aspirations. Upon arriving in Khoy, Simko, in conjunction with Persian democrats, massacred approximately 3,800-4,000 Armenian and Assyrian women and children. Many were also forcibly converted to Islam.

== See also ==
- Agha Petros
- Simko Shikak
- Shimun XIX Benyamin
- Malik Khoshaba
