= Chahriq =

Chahriq (Persian: چهريق) may refer to:

- Chehriq, a citadel in West Azerbaijan Province, Iran
- Chahriq-e Olya, a village in West Azerbaijan Province, Iran
- Chahriq-e Sofla, a village in West Azerbaijan Province, Iran
- Chahriq Rural District, an administrative subdivision or West Azerbaijan Province, Iran
