= Battle of Shekar Yazi =

1920 Simko Shikak revolt battle in Iran

- Part of Simko Shikak revolt (1918–1922)
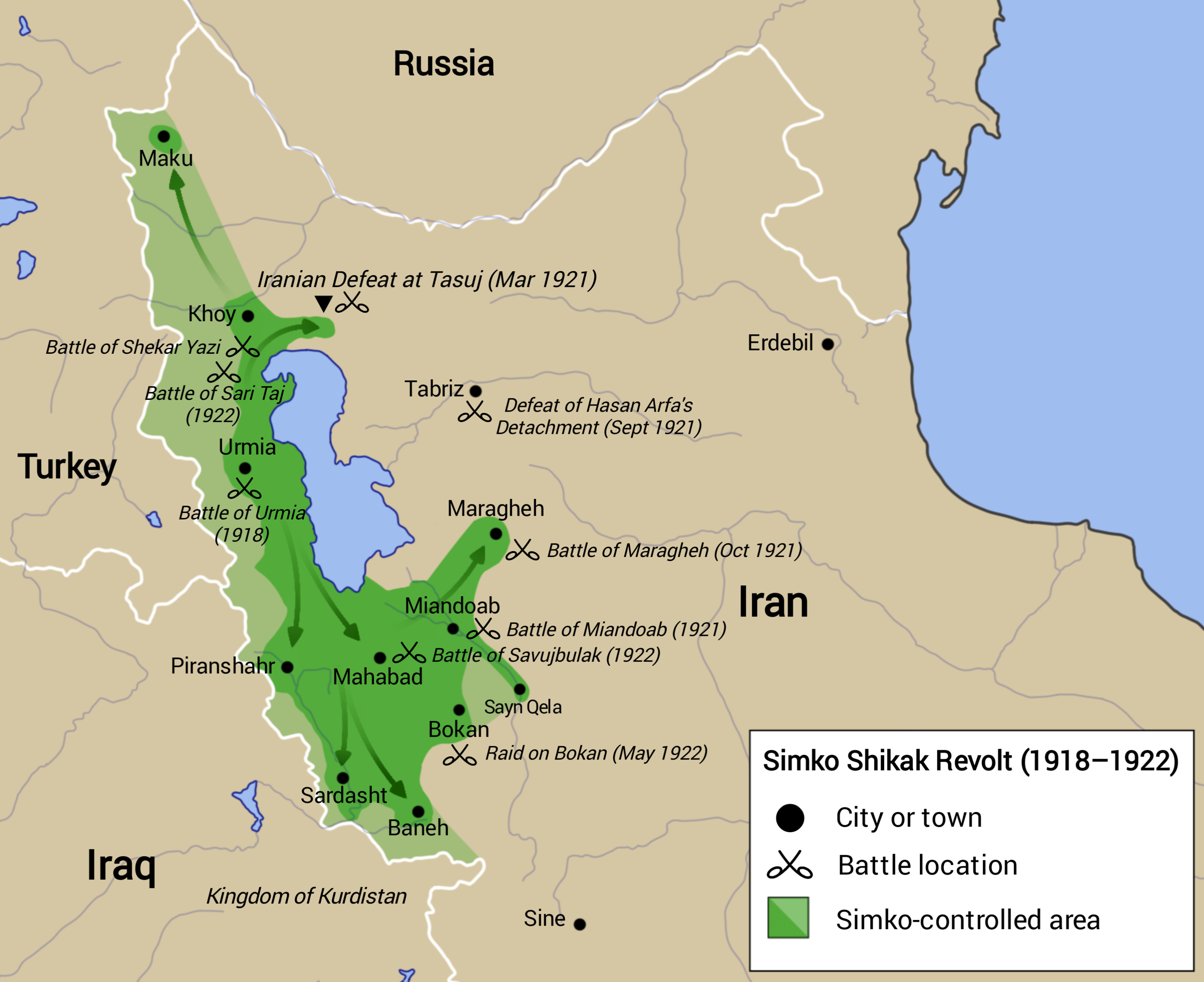
- Map depicting Simko's revolts, including the Battle of Shekar Yazi
Date	21 January 1920
Location	Shekar Yazi, West Azerbaijan Province, Iran 38.2718068°N 44.9429702°E
Result	Kurdish victory: Simko's forces maintained control until the 1921 Persian coup d'état and the coming to power of Reza Shah

Belligerents
Qajar Iran: Haji-Alilu tribe	(Simko Shikak) Kurdish forces: Shikakis; Zibaris

Commanders and leaders
(Qajar Iran) Fathollah Khan Akbar (Qajar Iran) Amir Arshad † (Qajar Iran) Hasan Arfa (Sweden) Lind Birck	Simko Shikak; Amar Khan Shikak; Fars Agha; Mahmud Agha

Units involved
Iranian Gendarmerie	

Strength
1,500 Gendarmerie; 3,000 Azerbaijani guerrillas (total: 5,000 fighters)	200 chivalry

Casualties and losses
Heavy losses (includes killing of Amir Arshad, the commander)	Unknown

Battle of Shekar Yazi (Kurdish: شەڕی شەکەریاز, romanized: Şeřî Şekeriyaz) took place on 21 January 1920 between the forces of Simko Shikak, a Kurdish tribal leader, and the government of Iran. This confrontation was part of the broader Kurdish uprisings in early 20th-century Iran, during a period marked by regional unrest and efforts by Kurdish leaders to assert autonomy.

== Battle ==
Iranian forces attacked from the mountains around Salmas and Urmia and entered Salmas and the regions under Samko's rule. When Simko saw the enemy forces advancing by capturing the front lines, he immediately ordered Amar Khan Shikak and his cavalry to attack the enemy positions in the Shekar Yazi plains, which the commander of the Iranian forces, Amir Arshad, was stationed there. Under Simko's orders, Amar Khan, along with a force of 200 Kurdish Zibaris commanded by Mahmud Agha and Fars Agha, attacked the positions of Amir Arshad and after a heavy battle they were able to defeat the enemy army and kill Amir Arshad.

After the killing of Amir Arshad, Iranian forces are left without a commander and the morale of the Iranian soldiers declines.

== Aftermath ==
After the failure of Iranian forces to resist Simko forces and the defeat and dispersion of Iranian forces, caused a great reaction throughout Iran.
