= Nima Shafeghdoost =

Iranian student (2006–2022)

Nima Shafeghdoost نیما شفیق‌دوست
- Born: 2006; Zindasht, West Azerbaijan province, Iran
- Died: 5 October 2022 (aged 16); Urmia, Iran
- Cause of death: Probably the severity of the injuries caused by gunshots by the police
- Occupation: High school student
- Known for: Among those killed in Mahsa Amini protests

Nima Shafeghdoost (2006–2022; Persian: نیما شفیق‌دوست) was a 16-year-old Iranian student who was shot during the Mahsa Amini protests in Urmia, Iran. Fearing arrest by security forces he fled but was eventually caught. Iranian security forces refused to take him to the hospital. He died of his wounds in custody.

== Early life ==
Nima Shafeghdoost spent his early years in Zindasht and lived with his family in Urmia, where he pursued his education.

== Incident and injuries ==
During the Mahsa Amini protests in Urmia, Shafeghdoost was wounded by a gunshot. Fearing arrest, he sought refuge in the basement of his father's house while receiving medical attention. However, security forces eventually identified and detained him. Despite the severity of his injuries, authorities refrained from taking him to the hospital.

== Death ==
On 5 October 2022, at the age of 16, Nima Shafeghdoost succumbed to his injuries while in custody. Despite the condition of his body, authorities resisted transferring him to a hospital. After several days of being unaware of his fate, his family received his body from security authorities.

== Islamic Republic's claim ==
The local law enforcement commander in Urmia claimed that Nima Shafeghdoost had voluntarily refrained from continuing his treatment after seeking medical attention for a dog bite, leading to fatal infection. This assertion is part of a pattern where the Islamic Republic authorities commonly attribute the deaths of protesters to suicide, underlying medical conditions, being bitten by dogs, or even alleged shooting among protesters.

The circumstances surrounding Nima Shafeghdoost's death remain contentious, with conflicting narratives from the government and those close to him, reflecting the complexities and challenges of information dissemination during periods of civil unrest.

== See also ==
- Political repression in the Islamic Republic of Iran
