= Battle of Miandoab =

Part of 1918–1922 Simko Shikak revolt, 1921

- Part of Simko Shikak revolt (1918–1922)
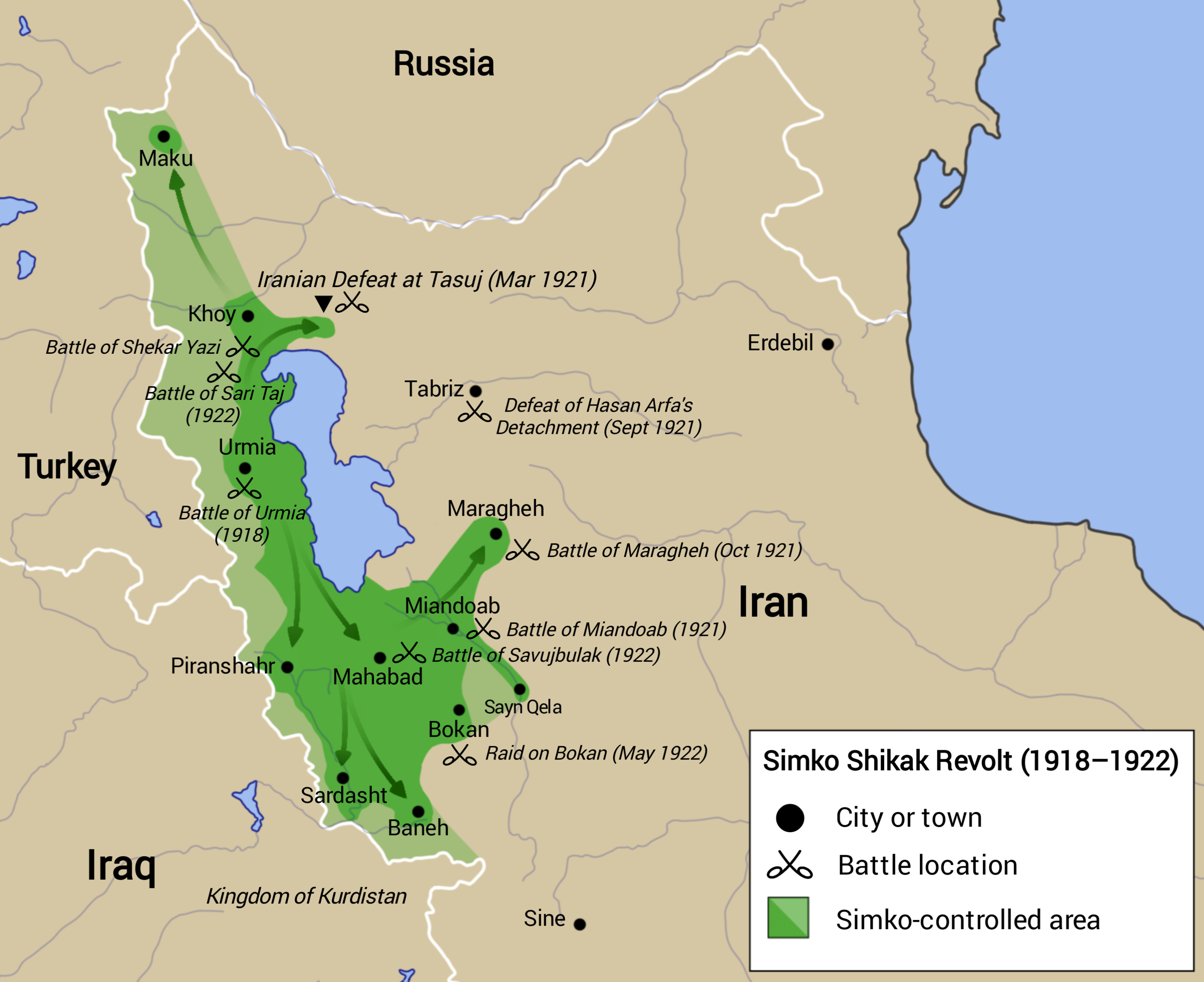
- Map of the Simko Shikak revolt (1918–1922)
Date	Early 1921
Location	Miandoab, West Azerbaijan, Iran
Result	Kurdish victory: Kurds took control of Miandoab; maintained in control until the 1921 Persian coup d'état and 1922 attacks.

Belligerents
(Qajar Iran) Qajar state Pahlavi Iran	(Simko Shikak) Kurdish forces: Shikak tribe; Mamash tribe

Commanders and leaders
(Qajar Iran) Fathollah Khan Akbar (Pahlavi Iran) Reza Khan; General Hassan Moqaddam; General Habibollah Sheibani	Simko Shikak; Amar Khan Shikak; Sayyid Taha

Strength
Unknown After the battle As of 7 April 1922: (Note: After the 1921 Persian coup d'état led by Reza Khan and the rise to power of the Pahlavis, and the attack on Simko's forces in Miandoab): 1,200 Cavalry; 800 Infantry; 4 Artillery guns; 10 Machine guns	4,000‒4,500 fighters 1,000 Ottoman Kurds

Casualties and losses
200+ killed 150 captured (most executed)	Unknown

Battle of Miandoab (Kurdish: شەڕی میاندواو, romanized: Şeřî Miyandiwaw) was a military engagement that took place in 1921 near the city of Miandoab, in the West Azerbaijan province of Iran. It was part of the broader uprising led by Simko Shikak, a Kurdish nationalist and tribal leader who sought to assert autonomy in northwestern Iran during the weakening of central authority in the aftermath of World War I.

The battle resulted in a Kurdish victory, with Simko's forces successfully repelling Iranian government troops and taking control of the area.

== Background ==
Following the collapse of the Qajars after World War I, Iran was politically fragmented, with various tribal leaders exercising autonomous control over their territories. One of the most prominent of these figures was Simko Shikak, a Kurdish leader who had established de facto rule in parts of northwestern Iran. From 1919 to 1922, Simko led a series of uprisings and formed loose alliances with other Kurdish and tribal leaders, exploiting the weakness of the central government of Iran to expand his power base.

Simko's rule in the region was marked by efforts to centralize authority within his domain, collect tribute, and maintain a standing military force. However, his ambitions increasingly alarmed the central authorities. His forces operated in areas such as Urmia, Salmas, and Miandoab, often clashing with Iranian military units and rival tribal elements. Reports of atrocities committed by his forces, including attacks on Assyrians and Armenians, further fueled opposition to his rule.

In 1921, Reza Khan, minister of war, initiated a military campaign to bring rebellious tribal regions under state control. Miandoab became a strategic target due to its location at the crossroads of tribal movement and its significance as a base of Simko's operations.

== Battle ==
The confrontation at Miandoab began when government forces, under officers loyal to Reza Khan, launched an offensive against Simko's entrenched positions. However, the Kurdish forces, experienced in irregular mountain warfare and well-fortified in the region, successfully repelled the attack. Simko's troops inflicted heavy losses on the Iranian forces, forcing them to retreat from the area and leaving Miandoab under Kurdish control; he was at the height of his power in 1921. Some Azerbaijanis in Miandoab and Maragheh sent letters of submission to Simko.

The victory at Miandoab marked one of Simko's most significant military achievements, consolidating his control over a large portion of northwestern Iran. His authority expanded further following the battle, and for a time, he governed effectively as a regional warlord.

Simko was in a strong enough position to potentially threaten Tabriz, one more victory could have made him "chieftain of all western tribes" and enabled him to establish a republic.

== Aftermath ==
Despite the Kurdish victory at Miandoab, the battle provoked a more forceful response from the central government. Reza Khan, committed to consolidating power and eliminating tribal autonomy, launched a series of broader campaigns in subsequent years. Although Simko attempted to expand and solidify his rule, internal divisions among the Kurdish tribes and growing pressure from the Iranian military eventually eroded his power base.

By 1922, government forces had begun to regain territory, and Simko's movement steadily declined. In 1930, he was lured into negotiations by Iranian authorities and assassinated by a trap, bringing an end to his resistance.

== See also ==
- Simko Shikak revolt (1926)
- Kurdish separatism in Iran

== Sources ==
- Arfa, Hassan (1964). Under Five Shahs. John Murray.
- Koohi-Kamali, F. (2003). The Political Development of the Kurds in Iran: Pastoral Nationalism. Springer. ISBN 978-0-230-53572-5.
- Gunter, Michael M. (2004). Historical Dictionary of the Kurds. Scarecrow Press. ISBN 9780810875074.
- Kia, Mehrdad (2023). The Clash of Empires and the Rise of Kurdish Proto-Nationalism, 1905–1926. Cambridge University Press. ISBN 9783031449734.
