= Battle of Sawcubilax =

Simko Shikak revolt battle, 1921

- Part of Simko Shikak revolt (1918–1922)
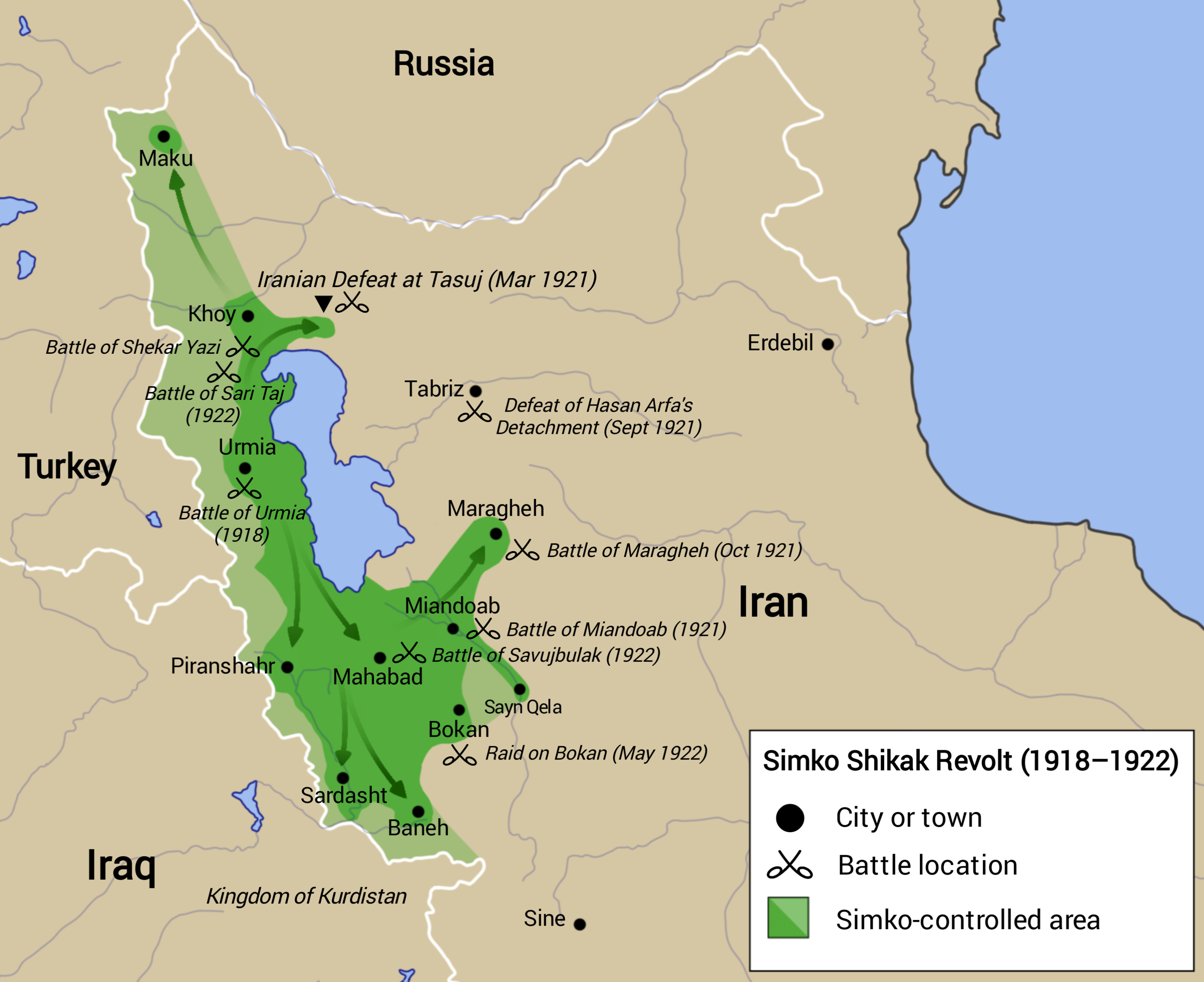
- Map of the Simko Shikak revolt (1918–1922)
Date	6–7 October 1921
Location	Sawcubilax (Now Mahabad), Persia
Result	Kurdish victory

Belligerents
(Qajar Iran) Qajar state	Kurdish forces: Kurdish tribes; Shikak; Mamash; Mangur; Dehbokri; Feyzollahbegi

Commanders and leaders
(Qajar Iran) Ahmad Qavam (Qajar Iran) Major Malekzadeh (POW) (Qajar Iran) C. Mohammed Taqi Khan Alp (POW)	Simko Shikak; Amar Khan Shikak; Sayyid Taha II; Hamza Agha

Units involved
Iranian Gendarmerie	

Strength
550–1,500 gendarmes and irregular units; about 600–800 troops	3,000 men and 500–600 infantry

Casualties and losses
Over 700 gendarmerie and military forces killed	50 killed
- 1 Armenian civilian killed 1 American citizen killed

The Battle of Sawcubilax or Battle of Mahabad (Kurdish: ڕەزمی ساوجوبڵاغ, romanized: Řezimî Sawcûbillax) was a military engagement that took place in October 1921 between the forces of the Kurdish chief Simko Shikak and the Persian Gendarmerie garrisoned in the Sawcubilax, south of Lake Urmia. The battle resulted in a decisive victory for Simko's forces, who destroyed the gendarmerie detachment. Following the capture Simko massacred the Persian forces.

== Background ==
Persian Major Malekzadeh, commanding a detachment of 550 gendarmes, was stationed in Sawcubilax with orders to prevent any extension of Simko's revolts to the south. The area was part of the territory under Simko's authority, which by mid-summer 1921 included all of Iran's territory west of Lake Urmia and extended south to Baneh and Sardasht, as well as parts of northwestern Iraq.

Malekzadeh grew suspicious of tribal activities and attempted to allay his anxieties by inviting two local Kurdish chiefs to a reception, where he treacherously arrested them and sent them to Tabriz. Simko, seeking to preempt an Iranian military plot to use forces in Sawcubilax and Miandoab to capture Urmia, held a large meeting with Kurdish tribal leaders at Chahriq, securing a decision to defend and liberate Kurdish territory.

== Battle ==
To deceive Malekzadeh, Simko feigned an attack north of Lake Urmia, but then marched south, entering Urmia on October 4, 1921. Simko had gathered a combined force of 3,000 men and 500 infantry. and was assisted by Sayyid Taha II.

Simko's forces surprised the gendarmes, attacking Sawcubilax on October 6, 1921. The Kurdish forces attacked from all sides; and the fighting lasted late into the night and continued until the Kurdish forces broke over the nearest hills on the morning of 7 October.

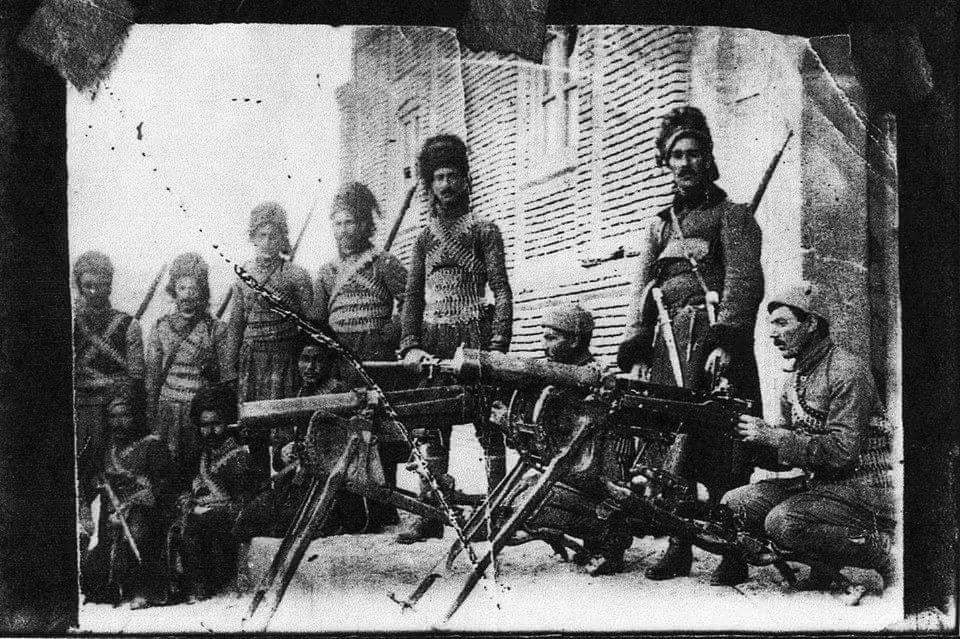
Picture of Simko’s forces during the battle in Mahabad

Malekzadeh, with Captain Mohammed Taqi Khan Alp and a few men, resisted in their headquarters for another day. Malekzadeh eventually sent a message of surrender to Sayyid Taha II, stating that he would surrender provided that his men and he 'are not disrespected'. Only when Simko responded did Malekzadeh realize he was defeated by Simko himself.

Malekzadeh's hesitation and lack of clear strategy, combined with the small size of his illequipped force which possessed only a decrepit cannon and four machine guns, contributed to the crushing defeat. Constant victories ensured Simko captured more arms and ammunition, significantly strengthening his forces. Following this battle, he seized all the gendarmerie's arms and munitions, including one cannon and four machine-guns.

== Aftermath ==
Following the surrender, the promise of sparing the lives of the prisoners was not respected. Sources state that nearly all prisoners had been shot after being stripped and their corpses left unburied. A British report claimed that a large number of the captured officers and soldiers were murdered by machine guns after they had surrendered. Even gendarmerie officers and soldiers in a local hospital were massacred with their throats cut. An Armenian Doctor and an American Citizen named Bashimon was also killed by the Kurds.

Simko spared the lives of Major Malekzadeh and his deputy, Mohammad Taqi Khan Alp. They were taken to Simko's headquarters at Chahriq and later released and sent to Tabriz, where they were eventually court-martialed.

The Kurdish victory in Sawcubilax allowed Simko's territory to reach its greatest extension by July 1922, stretching as far east and south as Sain Qaleh (Shahin Dezh) and Saqqez.

Following the capture, Sawcubilax was declared the capital of Simko's independent Kurdistan, though he did not reside there. Simko appointed a loyal chieftain, Hamzeh Agha of the Mamash, as governor.

Sawcubilax quickly changed hands several times before being fully recovered by government forces ten months later in August 1922.

== Sources ==
- Arfa, Hassan (1965). Under Five Shahs. William Morrow.
- Tabeki, Tourej (2008). ایران و جنگ جهانی اول: میدان نبرد قدرت‌های بزرگ. Qeqnoos. ISBN 9789643117658.
- Kia, Mehrdad (2023). The Clash of Empires and the Rise of Kurdish Proto-Nationalism, 1905–1926: Ismail Agha Simko and the Campaign for an Independent Kurdish State. Palgrave Macmillan (Springer Nature). ISBN 978-3-031-44972-7.
- Qadri, Muhammed S. (2021). Emer Xanî Şikak: Le Serhelldanî Simkowe ta Komarî Kurdistan [Amar Khan Shikak: from the rise of Simko to the Kurdistan Republic] (PDF) (in Kurdish). Tehran, Iran: Kurdish Academy.
