= Chris Kutschera =

Paul Maubec, known by his pen name Chris Kutschera (13 May 1938 – 31 July 2017 (Note: Sources disagree on his exact date of death (31 July or 1 August))), was a French journalist, researcher, writer and specialist on the Middle East, with particular interest focused on Kurdish national movements. During his career he interviewed and photographed leading Kurdish figures, many of whom later took senior government positions, including: Mustafa Barzani, Dara Tawfiq, Masoud Barzani, Jalal Talabani, Nechirvan Barzani, Abdullah Öcalan, Hoshyar Zibari and Barham Saleh.

== Bibliography ==
- Le Mouvement national kurde, Flammarion, 1979
- Le Défi kurde ou le Rêve fou d'indépendance, Bayard Éditions, 1997
- Le Kurdistan, Guide littéraire, Éditions Favre, 1998
- Le Livre noir de Saddam Hussein, Oh ! Éditions, 2005
- Stories Kurdistan Histoires, 2007
- La Longue Marche des Kurdes 40 ans de reportage au Kurdistan, JePublie, 2011
