= Jafar Agha =

Kurdish tribal leader of the Shekak tribe

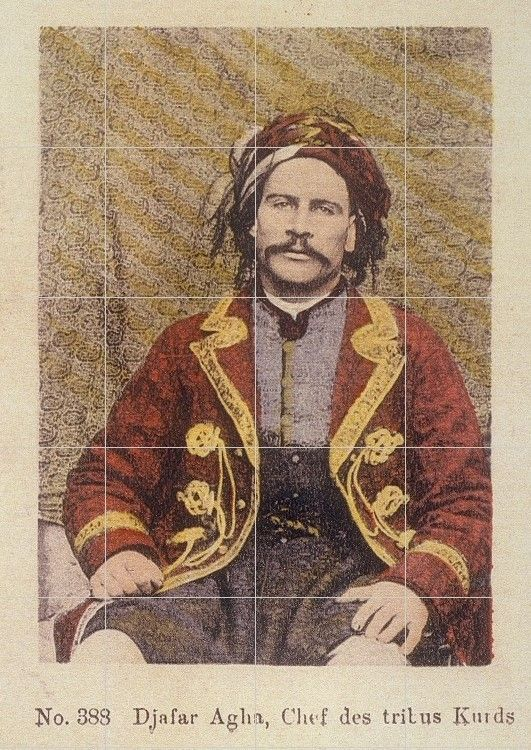
- A portrait of Jafar Agha
- Born: Chahriq-e Olya, Iran
- Died: 1905; Tabriz, Persia
- Cause of death: Ambush
- Title: Chieftain of the Shekak tribe
- Predecessor: Teymur Agha
- Successor: Simko Shikak

Jafar Agha Shikak (Kurdish: جەعفەر ئاغا, romanized: Ce'fer Axa) was a Kurdish chieftain of the Shekak tribe in the early 20th century in Qajar Iran. He played an important role in the leadership of the tribe. In 1905, Jafar Agha was killed in Tabriz by an Iranian government trap. His death caused tensions in the region, and led to his younger brother Simko Shikak taking over the leadership of the Shekak tribe.

== Biography ==
Jafar Agha was born in Chahriq-e Olya to Mohammad Agha Shikak, who belonged to the Awdoyi clan of the Shikak tribe, and was the son of Ismail Agha, the leader of the tribe, who died in 1816. As children, Jafar Agha and his younger brother Ismail (Simko) Agha both had very high morale as they would sit together and listen to stories about their ancestors fighting against the Turks and Persians. Jafar Agha later became the leader of the tribe, and enforced his rule throughout Iranian Kurdistan. In the lands controlled by Jafar Agha, the Iranian government had no authority. When Jafar Agha robbed rich people, he distributed the loot evenly to the poor. Jafar Agha regularly looted and pillaged Urmia, Salmas, and Khoy. Simko had often accompanied him as well. As early as 1889, Jafar Agha accompanied Abdul Razzaq Badirkhan as he visited Russia to propose cooperation. Jafar Agha along with Ahmet Agha, commanded Kurdish regiments in the Russo-Turkish war of 1828-1829 and the Crimean war, under the supervision of Captain Loris Melikov. In 1905, Hossein-Qoli Mafi Nezam-ol-Saltaneh, the governor of Tabriz, invited Jafar Agha to Tabriz for negotiations and swore on the Quran that Jafar Agha would not be harmed. The governor also promised recognition of a Kurdish autonomy with Jafar Agha in control. When Jafar Agha arrived, he entered the office of the governor, and was shot in the heart as he was unsuspectingly walking up the stairs. His body was cut into pieces and displayed. Simko succeeded Jafar Agha as the leader of the tribe and swore to take revenge. Simko used the same methods as Jafar Agha and also targeted Assyrian and Azerbaijani communities. Jafar Agha and Simko were loved by the Kurdish peasantry, although the local Assyrians and Azerbaijanis lived in fear. Vladimir Minorsky, who personally met Jafar Agha, wrote that he had what many would consider the "original" Kurdish appearance.

== See also ==
- Simko Shikak
- Shekak
