= Dost Mohammad Khan Baloch =

Ruler of Western Balochistan

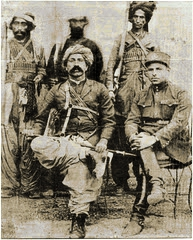
- Sardar Mir Dost Mohammad Khan Baranzai Baloch (sitting first from left) with his aides and body guards, c. 1928.
- Born: Balochistan, Qajar Iran
- Died: 16 January 1930; Tehran, Pahlavi Iran
- Cause of death: Execution by hanging
- Criminal charges: Murder

Dost Mohammad Khan Baloch (also spelled Dust-Mohammad Khan Baluch; Persian: دوست محمد خان بلوچ, Balochi: امیر سردار دوست محمد خان بارانزی بلوچ), also known as Mir Dost Muhammad Khan Baluch (died 16 January 1930), was a ruler in Iranian (Western) Baluchistan from 1921 until 1928.

== Biography ==
Dost Mohammad Khan was the nephew of the previous Baloch Barakzay (or Baranzai) ruler, Mir Bahram Khan. He succeeded his uncle in 1921, and was recognized as the hakem (i.e. governor) of Bampur by the Iranian Qajar government. The Baluch Barakzays had become the most powerful government in Iranian (Western) Baluchistan, due to their control over both Fahraj-Bampur and Saravan, as well as due to advantageous marriage alliance with rulers of the major towns and villages of Makran. Dost Mohammad made significant progress consolidating the political power that had been established by his predecessor Mir Bahram Khan, primarily by making more advantageous marriage alliances.

In March 1924 control of the tribes of the Sarhadd district of Iranian Baluchistan was formally given to the Iranian government. The tribes of this district had received British subsidies ever since the British occupational forces led by the British Colonel Reginald Dyer had entered this area of Iran in 1915/6 (see also; Persian campaign (World War I)). The Iranian government subsequently took measures in order to continue paying the tribes of the Sarhadd district. However, as the Iranian government failed to fulfill this arrangement, disturbances broke out in Sarhadd in the summers of 1925 and 1926, due to high-handed measures by certain Iranian military officials, as well as due to general discontent among the Sarhadd district tribes, who were no longer receiving subsidies. No serious fighting took place, however, and the disturbances ended, after the Iranian government provided further assurances to the tribes.

In 1928, the newly established Pahlavi government of Iran, led by Reza Shah, found itself sufficiently able to focus again on Baluchistan. Dost Mohammad Khan refused to submit however, and believed that the network of alliances which he had built up during the past few years over the entire Baluchistan Province south of the Sarhadd district. However, these very same alliances which Dost Mohammad had built his trust on dissolved as soon as Iranian government General Amanullah Jahanbani entered the area. The Baluch Rigi, Gamshad-zai, Yar-Mohammad-zai and Ismail-zai tribes were allied with Reza Shah against Dost Mohammad Khan. Thus, Dost Mohammad Khan was left with a relatively small force and a few allies "of any consequence". The Iranian army easily defeated Dost Mohammad Khan. The anthropologist Brian Spooner adds: "once again Baluch political unity proved highly brittle". Dost Mohammad Khan eventually surrendered to the Iranian governmental forces and was subsequently pardoned on condition that he live in the Iranian capital of Tehran. One year after moving to Tehran, however, he managed to escape while he was on a hunting trip. He was quickly captured, and, as he had killed his guard during his escape, he was hanged for murder.

The rest of the Baloch Barakzay moved to British territory, with the British giving them allowances as long as they remained on British soil. The Iranians continued to govern Iranian Balochistan through local rulers. Jan-Mohammad Buledi was appointed sardar of Qasr-e Qand, Mehrab Khan Bozorgzadeh was appointed sardar of Jaleq. The Iranian government also gave Bozorgzadeh back his property which he had lost to Dost Mohammad Khan. Mohammadshah Mir-Moradzay was appointed sardar of Sib, whereas lastly, Shahbaz Khan Bozorgzadeh was appointed sardar of Dezak.

== Rule ==
Dust Mohammad Khan dealt in a suppressive way with his tribal subjects and smaller Baluchi clans. As a result, a group of tribal leaders sent a mission to then Iranian King Ahmad Shah Qajar (r. 1909–1925), requesting the Iranian state to send government forces to Baluchistan in order to deal with Dust Mohammad Khan. Such dissatisfactions and grievances by ordinary people and competing tribes in Baluchistan, but also Kurdistan and Khuzestan, resulted in aforementioned peoples welcoming the policies of Reza Shah aimed at disarming the powerful tribal groups in Iran.

== Legacy ==
The political scientist Hamid Ahmadi explains:

Though Reza Shah’s armed confrontation with tribal leaders in different parts of Iran was interpreted as an example of ethnic conflict and ethnic suppression by the Iranian state, the fact is that it was more a conflict between the modern state and traditional socio-political structure of pre-modern era and had less to do with the question of ethnicity and ethnic conflict. While some Marxist political activists (see Nābdel 1977) and ethno-nationalist intellectuals of different Iranian groups (Ghassemlou 1965; Hosseinbor 1984; Asgharzadeh 2007) have introduced this confrontation as a result of Reza Shah’s ethnocentric policies, no valid documents have been presented to prove this argument. Recent documentary studies (Borzū’ī 1999; Zand-Moqaddam 1992; Jalālī 2001) convincingly show that Reza Shah’s confrontation with Baluch Dust Mohammad Khan, Kurdish Simko and Arab Sheikh Khaz‘al have merely been the manifestation of state-tribe antagonism and nothing else.

Dost Mohammad Khan is viewed as a martyr within the context of Baloch nationalism.

== See also ==
- Mohammad Khan Baloch
- History of Baluchistan
- Sistan and Baluchestan province
- Seistan Force
