= Chahriq-e Sofla =

Chahriq-e Sofla چهريق سفلي
- Village
- Location within Iran
- Coordinates: 38°04′39″N 44°36′45″E
- Country: Iran
- Province: West Azerbaijan
- County: Salmas
- Bakhsh: Kuhsar
- Rural District: Chahriq

Population (2006)
  - Total: 310
- Time zone: UTC+3:30 (IRST)
  - Summer (DST): UTC+4:30 (IRDT)

Chahriq-e Sofla (Persian: چهريق سفلي, also Romanized as Chahrīq-e Soflá; also known as Chahrīq-e Pā'īn) is a village in Chahriq Rural District, Kuhsar District, Salmas County, West Azerbaijan Province, Iran. At the 2006 census, its population was 310, in 54 families.
