= Dara Tawfiq =

20th Century Kurdish nationalist

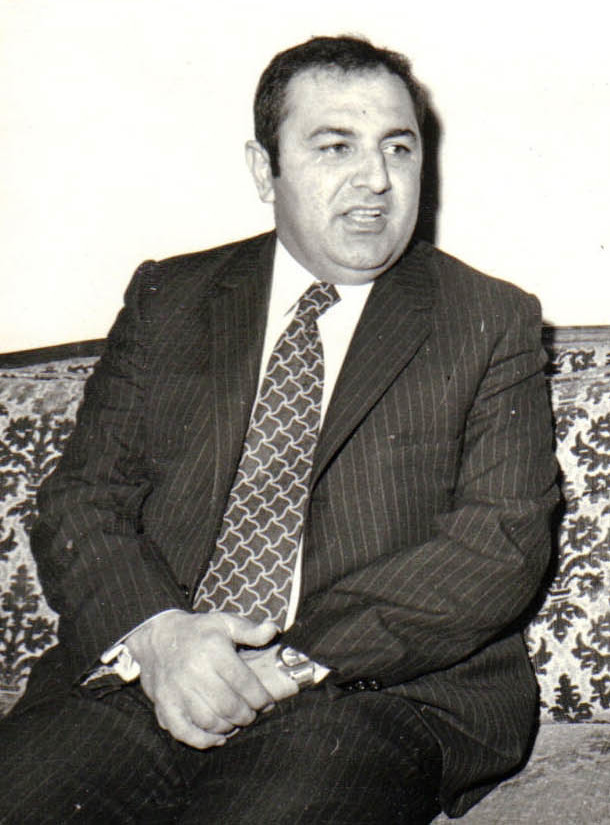
- Born: 1932; Sulaymaniyah, Iraq
- Disappeared: November 1981 (age 49); Baghdad, Iraq
- Status: Presumed murdered
- Occupations: Journalist, politician
- Known for: Editor of Iraqi-Kurdish newspaper Al-Taakhi

Dara Tawfiq (Kurdish: دارا توفيق; 1932 – November 1981) was a journalist and prominent member of the Kurdish Democratic Party (KDP) in the late 1960s and 1970s. An adviser to Kurdish leader Mustafa Barzani, he often acted as a conduit for the KDP's relations with the Soviet Union. Considered popular within the Kurdish nationalist movement, his writing focused on national liberation and peace movements. In November 1981, following opposition to the Iran-Iraq war, Tawfiq was arrested and never seen again.

== Biography ==
Tawfiq was born in 1932 in Sulaymaniyah. He studied civil engineering at Baghdad University, but was expelled for political activities and subsequently continued studies in Britain.

In 1956, Tawfiq helped found the Kurdish Students' Society in Europe (KSSE) in Wiesbaden.

In the late 1950s and early 1960s, Tawfiq worked in Budapest as a staff member at the secretariat of the World Federation of Democratic Youth. At the 8th Congress of the KDP in 1970 he was elected to the party's central committee.

In the early 1970s Tawfiq was the editor of the KDP's Arabic-language newspaper Al-Taakhi ("Brotherhood"), which earned praise as Iraq's only independent newspaper at that time.

In February 1972, Tawfiq was selected to join a committee tasked with negotiations between the KDP and the Ba'ath Party on autonomy for the Kurds in Iraq following the peace agreement of 1970. During the early to mid-1970s, Tawfiq was associated with the moderate faction of the KDP; those who accepted the autonomy law proposed by the Iraqi government and who sought Kurdish cultural and economic autonomy within the national framework of that time.

Following the defeat and exile of the KDP in the Second Iraqi–Kurdish War, Tawfiq surrendered to the authorities and was given a position within the Iraqi government, becoming director-general of the State Enterprise for River Transport by 1978.

Tawfiq was opposed to the Iran-Iraq war, which started in 1980. He was arrested by Iraqi security forces in November 1981 and was never seen again; he is presumed to have been executed.
