= Simko Shikak revolt (1926) =

Kurdish uprising in Iran

2nd Simko Shikak Revolt
- Part of Kurdish separatism in Iran
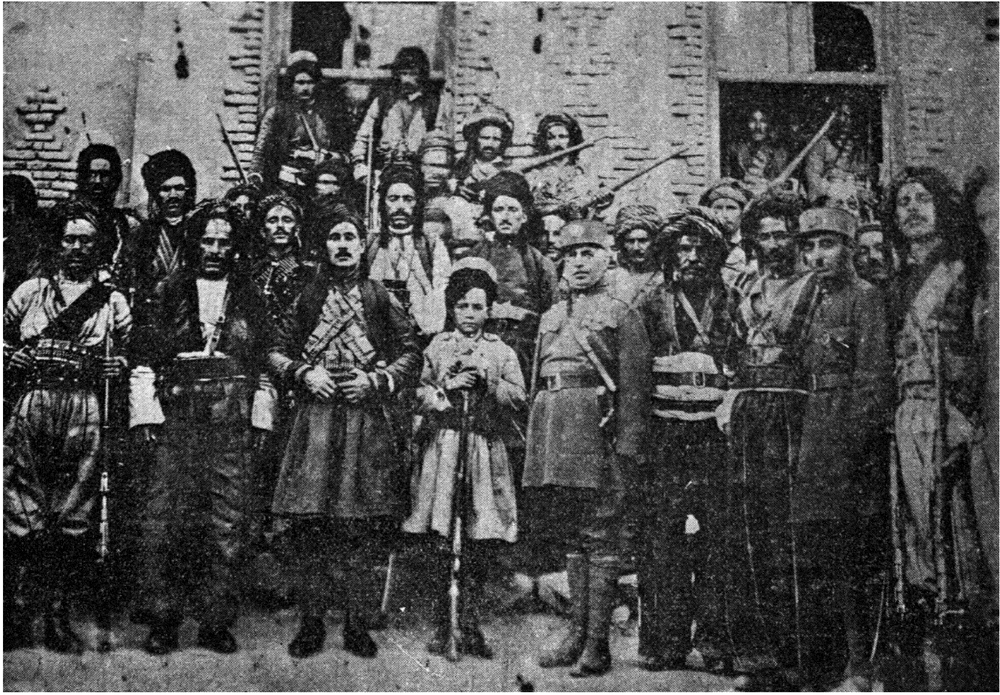
- Shikak and his fighters
Date	October 1926
Location	Dilman (Salmas), North western Iran
Result	Iranian victory

Belligerents
(Simko Shikak) Kurdish forces; (Kurds) Kurdish tribes; Shekak tribesmen; Herki tribesmen; Begzade tribesmen	Imperial State of Iran

Commanders and leaders
Simko Shikak (Kurds) Haji Agha (Kurds) Fattah Agha (Kurds) Seyde Agha	Reza Shah; Habibollah Sheibani

Strength
6,000–10,000	Unknown

Casualties and losses
Unknown	Unknown

1926 Simko Shikak revolt (Kurdish: دووەم شۆڕشی شکاک, romanized: Diwem şořişî Simkoy Şikak) was a short-timed Kurdish uprising against the Pahlavi dynasty of Iran in 1926, led by Kurdish chieftain Simko Shikak from Shekak tribe.

== Background ==
In 1918, Kurdish chieftain Simko Shikak started his first Ottoman-backed revolt against the Iranian government. His expeditions resulted in regional plunder and massacres of Assyrians and Armenians. After three years of revolt he was defeated, but in 1924 Reza Khan pardoned him and he returned to Iran from exile. When Reza Khan had become Reza Shah in 1925, Simko pledged eternal loyalty to him and the Iranian state. However, next year Simko allied himself with Haji Agha of Herki and tribal chiefs of Begzada, regained control of his tribe and began another rebellion.

== Revolt ==
In October 1926, a brief military conflict began at Salmas (also known as Dilman or Shahpur) in which the Kurdish rebels under Simko Shikak began to besiege the city with a force of 1,500 men. Shortly after, Iranian forces were dispatched from Urmia, Sharafkhaneh and Khoy, engaged the Kurdish rebels and defeated them. During the engagement, half of Shekak's troops defected to the tribe's previous leader and Simko himself fled to Mandatory Iraq.

== Aftermath ==
In 1926, another unrelated Kurdish tribal revolt occurred in Kurdistan province. Kurdish insurgency and seasonal migrations in late 1920s, along with long-running tensions between Tehran and Ankara, resulted in border clashes and even military penetrations in both Iranian and Turkish territory. In 1930, the commander of the Iranian Army, General Hassan Moghaddam, sent a letter to Simko, who was residing in the village of Barzan, and invited him for a meeting in the town of Oshnavieh. After consulting with his friends, Simko along with Khurshid Agha Herki went to Oshnaviyeh and were invited to the house of local army commander, Colonel Norouzi and were told to wait for the Iranian general. On 30 June 1930, Colonel Norouzi convinced Simko to go to the outskirts of Oshnavieh to welcome the general's arrival. However, this was a trap and Simko was ambushed and killed by Iranian troops on the evening of June 30, 1930.

Simko's revolts are considered as attempt by a powerful tribal chief to establish his personal authority vis-à-vis the central government throughout the region. Although elements of Kurdish nationalism were present in this movement, historians agree these were hardly articulate enough to justify a claim that recognition of Kurdish identity was a major issue in Simko's movement. It lacked any kind of administrative organization and Simko was primary interested in plunder. Government forces and non-Kurds were not the only ones to suffer in the attacks, the Kurdish population was also robbed and assaulted. Simko's men do not appear to have felt any sense of unity or solidarity with fellow Kurds. On the other hand, Reza Shah's military victories over Kurdish and Turkic tribal leaders began a repressive era towards non-Persian minorities.

== See also ==
- Timeline of Kurdish uprisings
- List of modern conflicts in the Middle East
