= Amir Arshad =

Iranian politician

Sam Khan, the headman of Haji-Alilu tribe of Arasbaran, was a legendary military commander in early twentieth century. He was given honorary titles such as Arshad Nezam, Sardar Arshad, Shoja Nezam, Salar Nezam, and Amir Arshad (امیر ارشد). In Chronicles of Naser al-Din Shah Qajar era, Amir Arshad is referred to as the commander of mounted troops stationed in Qaradağ. Amir Arshad and his brother, Moḥammad Ḥosayn Khan Sardār(-e) Ashayer, supported the Constitutionalists during Persian Constitutional Revolution. In the winter of 1909–10, they helped revolutionary forces crush the Chalabianlu and their allies, who, under the leadership of Rahimkhan Chalabianloo, had been the major supporters of the deposed Mohammad Ali Shah Qajar. Consequently, in 1911-1920 period, Amir Arshad was effectively ruling Arasbaran region, a vast area north of Tabriz.

Amir Arshad was killed in the Battle of Shekar Yazi against Kurdish insurgency. He is credited with fending off the communism from Iran. Amir Arshad's residence in the Okhara village of Varzaqan County is still standing and has been registered as a historical site.
