= Shekar Yazi =

Village in West Azerbaijan province, Iran

Shekar Yazi Persian: شكريازي
- Village
- Location within Iran
- Coordinates: 38°18′28″N 44°56′24″E
- Country: Iran
- Province: West Azerbaijan
- County: Salmas
- District: Central
- Rural District: Koreh Soni

Population (2016)
  - Total: 2,361
- Time zone: UTC+3:30 (IRST)

Shekar Yazi (Persian: شكريازي) (Note: Also romanized as Shekar Yāzī, Sheker Yāzī, and Shekeryazī) is a village in Koreh Soni Rural District of the Central District in Salmas County, West Azerbaijan province, Iran.

== Demographics ==
=== Population ===
At the time of the 2006 National Census, the village's population was 2,245 in 438 households. The following census in 2011 counted 2,498 people in 619 households. The 2016 census measured the population of the village as 2,361 people in 641 households.

== See also ==
- Battle of Shekar Yazi
