= Oshnavieh =

City in West Azerbaijan province, Iran

Oshnavieh اشنویه
- City
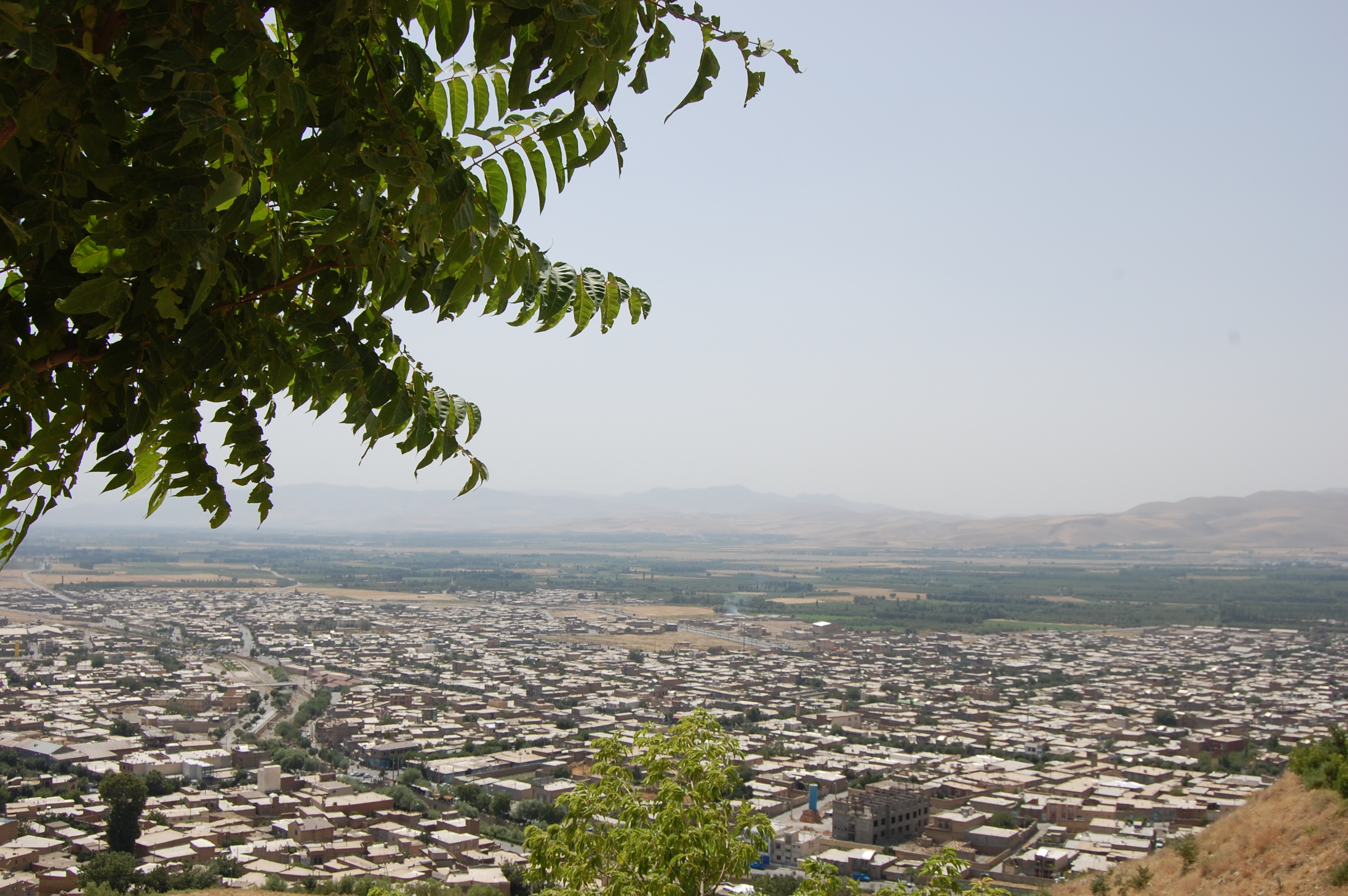
- View of the city of Oshnavieh

- Location within Iran
- Coordinates: 37°02′11″N 45°05′44″E
- Country: Iran
- Province: West Azerbaijan
- County: Oshnavieh
- District: Central

Government

Population (2016)
  - Total: 39,801
- Time zone: UTC+3:30 (IRST)

Oshnavieh (Persian: اشنويه) (Note: Also romanized as Oshnavīyeh; Kurdish: شنۆ, romanized as Şino) is a city in the Central District of Oshnavieh County, West Azerbaijan province, Iran, serving as capital of both the county and the district.

Oshnavieh County is bordered by Naqadeh County to the east, by Piranshahr County to the south, by Urmia County to the north, and by Iraqi Kurdistan Province to the west.

== History ==
Oshnavieh lies on the historic route from Urmia basin to Rawandiz over the Kalashin Pass. An Urartian stele from about 800 BCE exist near the city. After the Mongol invasion, the city became the seat of the Nestorian Church for a brief moment.

Medieval geographers from the 10th century wrote that the city was fair-sized, attached to Urmia, fertile and having good pasture. Kurds from the Hadhabani tribe would settle in the area during the summer, pasture their livestock and sell their products for manufactures and textiles from the city. The city came under the rule of the Rawadids in the 10th century and continued to flourish. The city also fostered scholars and traditionalists.

Ali ibn al-Athir wrote in 1205/6 that Nusrat al-Din Abu Bakr of the Eldiguzids handed over the city to the ruler of Maragheh ʿAlāʾ-al-Din Qara Sonqor. In 1226, the city was under the Ivāʾiya Kurds until its capture by Jalal al-Din Mangburni. In 1220/1, when Yaqut al-Hamawi passed the city, the city was in ruins, but had been rebuilt by the time of the visit of Hamdallah Mustawfi. Mustawfi described the city as being Sunni, in a rural district of 120 villages and producing a total revenue worth 19,300 dinars annually. It was mentioned by traveller Fraser in 1840 that the city was populated Zerza Kurds, whose presence is possibly attested as being present in the city as early as the 14th century.

In the 19th century, the population was mostly Kurdish with a small population of Assyrians which perished during the Sayfo.

When Sheikh Ubeydullah and his forces advanced from Ottoman Hakkari towards Urmia, he captured Oshnavieh and made it his capital until he was defeated in 1880.

=== 20th century ===
In 1930, Kurdish leader Simko Shikak was lured into an ambush in Oshnavieh and assassinated under the order of Reza Shah.

The town was incorporated into the short-lived Republic of Mahabad in 1946.

=== 21st century ===
Protesters briefly took over the city during the Mahsa Amini protests, from 24 to 25 September 2022.

== Demographics ==
=== Language and ethnicity ===
The city is populated by Kurds who speak Sorani and Kurmanji.

=== Population ===
At the time of the 2006 National Census, the city's population was 29,896 in 6,572 households. The following census in 2011 counted 32,723 people in 8,149 households. The 2016 census measured the population of the city as 39,801 people in 10,667 households.
