= Zindasht =

Village in West Azerbaijan province, Iran

Zindasht Persian: زيندشت
- Village
- Location within Iran
- Coordinates: 38°02′39″N 44°53′42″E
- Country: Iran
- Province: West Azerbaijan
- County: Salmas
- District: Central
- Rural District: Kenarporuzh

Population (2016)
  - Total: 573
- Time zone: UTC+3:30 (IRST)

Zindasht (Persian: زيندشت) (Note: Also romanized as Zīndasht) is a village in Kenarporuzh Rural District of the Central District in Salmas County, West Azerbaijan province, Iran.

== Population ==
At the time of the 2006 National Census, the village's population was 910 in 157 households. The following census in 2011 counted 682 people in 141 households. The 2016 census showed the population as 573 people in 149 households.
