= Chahriq-e Olya =

Village in West Azerbaijan province, Iran

Chahriq-e Olya Persian: چهريق عليا
- Village
- Location within Iran
- Coordinates: 38°04′43″N 44°35′52″E
- Country: Iran
- Province: West Azerbaijan
- County: Salmas
- District: Kuhsar
- Rural District: Chahriq

Population (2016)
  - Total: 831
- Time zone: UTC+3:30 (IRST)

Chahriq-e Olya (Persian: چهريق عليا) (Note: Also romanized as Chahrīq-e ‘Olyā; also known as Chahrīq, Chahriq Qal‘eh, Chara, and Qal‘eh-e Chahrīq; Kurdish: چەھریق, romanized: Çehirîq or Çarî (چاری); Armenian: Ճարա or Ճառիկ) is a village in, and the capital of, Chahriq Rural District in Kuhsar District of Salmas County, West Azerbaijan province, Iran.

== History ==
In the early Qajar era, some of the Kurdish Shakak tribe settled in Chahriq after being forced out of Urmia by the Afshar Turks. The Ottoman Empire, which bordered the village, had claimed it numerous times. During the Russo-Iranian War of 1826–1828, Chahriq was briefly captured by the Russians in 1828. The population of the village at the time was made up of Assyrians, Armenians, and Sunni Kurds. In 1844, Mohammad Shah Qajar (r. 1834–1848) received an offer of marriage from the Shakak chieftain Yahya Khan for his sister. Mohammad Shah responded by giving Yahya Khan the governorship of Khoy, Salmas, and Urmia, the latter of which included all of the frontier of northwestern Iran, including Chahriq. Yahya Khan continued to be Chahriq's only landowner even after his retirement. In May 1848, while he was still governor, the founder of Bábism, Báb, was put in a jail in Chahriq.

== Demographics ==
=== Population ===
At the time of the 2006 National Census, the village's population was 680 in 137 households. The following census in 2011 counted 783 people in 179 households. The 2016 census measured the population of the village as 831 people in 202 households. It was the most populous village in its rural district.

== See also ==
- Chehriq
- Simko Shikak

== Sources ==
- Kia, Mehrdad (2023). The Clash of Empires and the Rise of Kurdish Proto-Nationalism, 1905–1926: Ismail Agha Simko and the Campaign for an Independent Kurdish State. Springer Nature. ISBN 978-3031449727.
