= Chehriq =

Citadel in Iranian Azerbaijan

Coordinates: 38°4′49″N 44°35′22″E

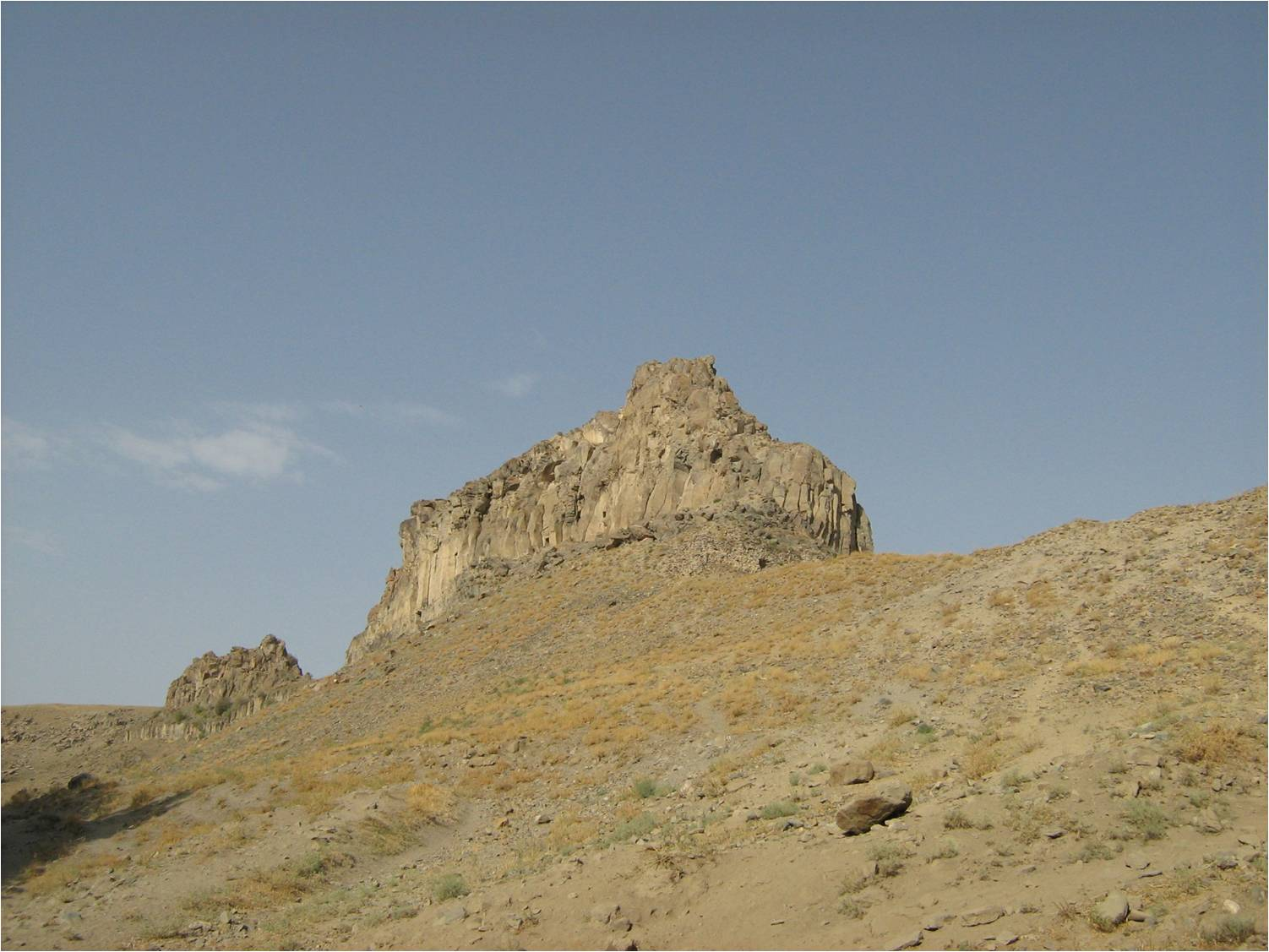
Chahriq

Chahriq (Persian: چهریق) (also Chahriq, Chiriq, Charik, Čahrīk or Shimko) is a citadel located in north-western Iran in West Azarbaijan Province, Salmas County, near Chahriq-e Olya and the Turkish border.

== History ==
The Báb was imprisoned at Chehriq prior to his execution at Tabriz in 1850.
