= Jilu =

District in Hakkari region, Upper Mesopotamia

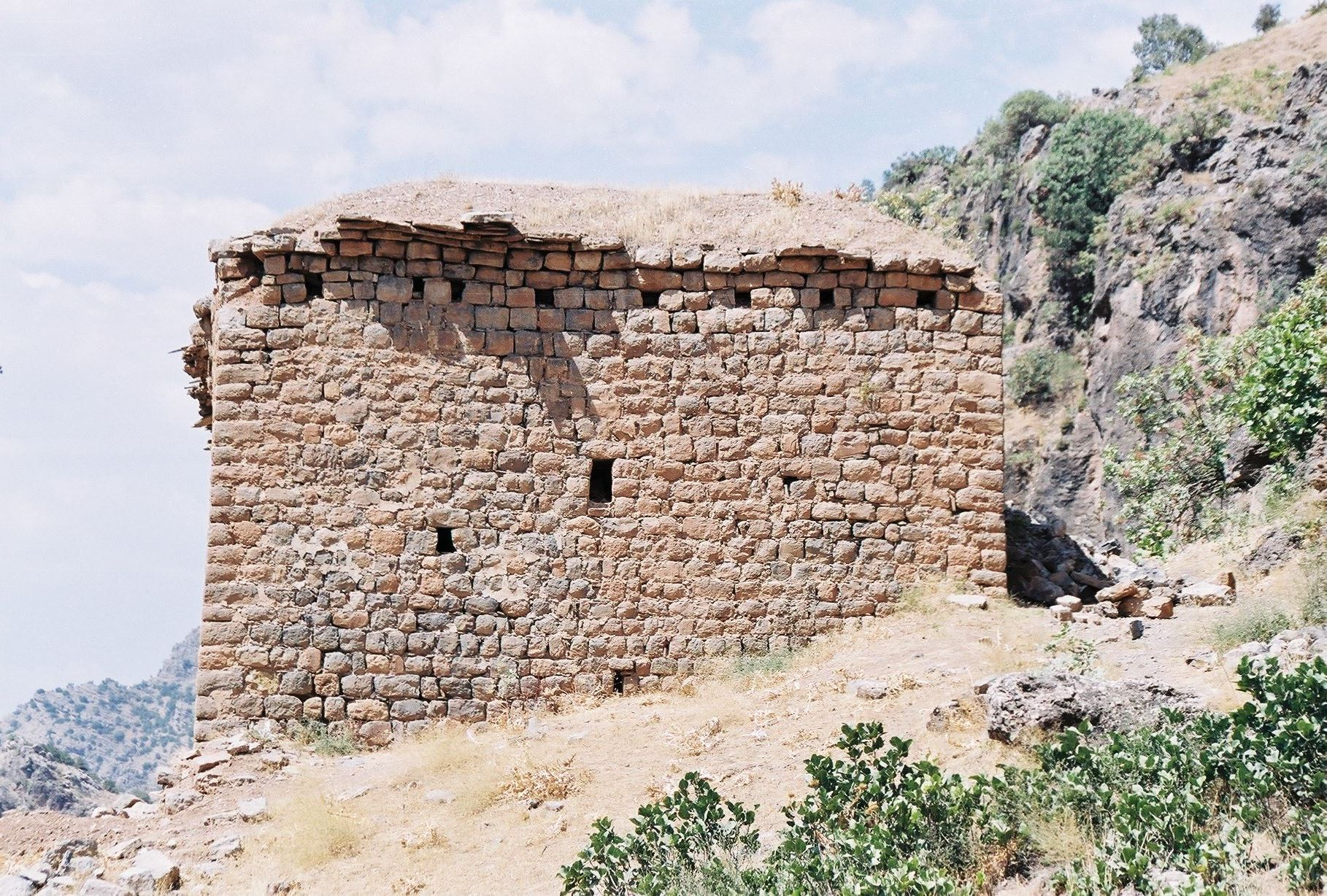
Assyrian church of St. George in Jilu.

Jīlū was a district and one of the five independent Assyrian tribes, located in the Hakkari region of upper Mesopotamia in modern-day Turkey. Before 1915, Jīlū was home to mostly Assyrians and as well as a minority of Kurds. There were 20 Assyrian villages in this district. The area was traditionally divided into Greater and Lesser Jīlū, and Ishtāzin – each with its own Malik, and consisting of a number of Assyrian villages. In the summer of 1915, during the Assyrian genocide, Jīlū was surrounded and attacked by Turkish troops and neighbouring Kurdish tribes under the leadership of Agha Sūtū of Oramar. It is now located around Yeşiltaş, Yüksekova.

After a brief struggle to maintain their positions, the Assyrian citizens of Jīlū were forced to flee to Salmas in Iran along with other refugees from the Hakkari highlands. Today their descendants live all over the world including Iraq, Syria, Iran, Lebanon, Russia, the United States, Canada, Australia and Europe. In Syria's al-Hasakah Governorate there are two villages, Tel-Gorān and Abū-Tīnā, established in 1935 by Jīlū refugees from Iraq on the banks of the Khabur River.

== Geography and Nature ==
The Jīlū district is home to the second highest mountain range in Turkey, the Cilo-Sat range, which are an eastern extension of the Taurus Mountains. The highest peak in the Cilo-Sat range is Toura Jelu (also known as Cilo dağı, maximum elevation 4,168 m), from the summit of which one can see as far as the city of Mosul in Iraq. The southern slopes of the massif are covered with broad-leaved forests (primarily oak), and the northern slopes are covered with steppes and shrub thickets where the inhabitants of Jīlū and Dīz would graze their herds during the summer. Among the animals which abound in these mountains are bears, leopards, wolves, foxes, chamois, wild goats, and ovis (wild sheep), of which there are three varieties. There are also many birds, especially the large yellow partridge, and the red-legged variety.

== History ==
Not much is known about Jīlū's pre-Christian history due to its inaccessibility and instability, restricting any form of fieldwork, though prehistoric rock carvings have been found in the Gevaruk valley near Sāţ and on the Tirisin Plateau. These have been dated to 10,000 years ago.

According to the Acts of Saint Mari, it was his disciple St. Ţomīs who was the first to bring Christianity to the region of Gawar and Zozān (including Jīlū) in the 1st century AD.The text also mentions that he was martyred somewhere in the Gawar plain, not far from Jīlū, and that later on a church was established on his burial site. Indeed, the ancient church in the Jīlū village of Sāţ (modern-day İkiyaka) is dedicated to St. Mārī, and is the only church in the Hakkari region or northern Iraq historically known to have had been. Mārī was also the name of one of the area's earliest bishops. He was among the signatories of the acts of the synod of Catholicos Mār Dādīshoʿ in 424 AD.

A hitherto unpublished text of the Acts of St. Mammes of Caesarea, who lived in the 3rd century AD, also credits him with having traveled to the village of Oramar (modern-day Dağlıca) where he built a church, known today as El Ahmar Kilisesi. A church also in Oramar dedicated to his disciple St. Daniel is now the village mosque. Afterwards, St. 'Azīzā - reputedly a disciple of Mar Awgin - is credited with having arrived in Jīlū during the 4th century AD, establishing a monastery in the village of Zêrīnī. The earliest surviving manuscript from the Jīlū district was copied in this monastery and dates back to 1212/3.

The Jīlū district is also home to one of the region's oldest churches, founded by St. Zayʿā and his disciple St. Tāwor in 427 AD. According to the Saint's vita, Jīlū at that time was the center of a kingdom named Jīlām-Jīlū and the church construction project was led by its king Bālaq son of King Zūraq. This church for many centuries was the cathedral of the Mār Sargīs Metropolitan Bishops of Jīlū. Most Jīlū's ancient churches are still standing, despite having been abandoned and in a state of decay for nearly a century.

=== 5th century, Church of the East origins ===
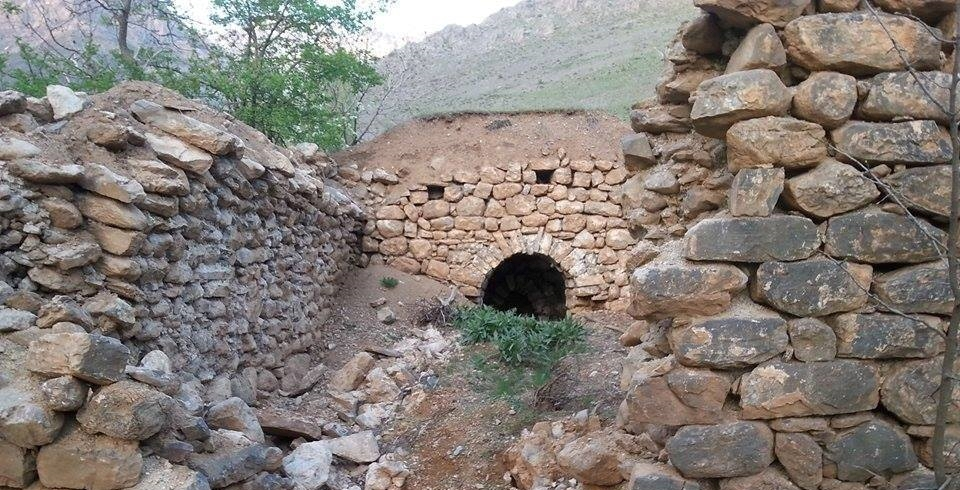
The ruins of the ancient Assyrian church of St. Mārī in the village of Sāt, Jīlū district, Yüksekova.

The Jīlū district was also important in the history of the Church of the East from an early period. At the synod of Catholicos Mār Isaac in 410 AD Beth-Bghāsh, located in the Jīlū village of Bé-Baghshé, was confirmed as a suffragan diocese of the ecclesiastical province of Adiabene. The future Catholicos-Patriarch Timothy I, an influential figure in the Church of the East's missionary movement, became bishop of Beth-Bghāsh c.770 AD, upon the retirement of his elderly uncle Gīwargīs, and remained in the diocese until his election as Catholicos-Patriarch in 780 AD. Although a native of Hazzah near Arbil, his family is traditionally held to have originated from Jīlū.

=== 15th century, destruction and revival ===
In 1448 the Jīlū district was ravaged by the Qara Qoyunlu and many of its villages lay abandoned for over a century. This is probably the reason why the colophon of a manuscript copied in 1490 at Bé-Silim in the Baz district mentions only the metropolitan of Mosul. Normally, Baz would have been included in either the diocese of Beth-Bghāsh or Jīlū.

Most of the refugees from Jīlū fled to Assyrian districts in neighboring Iran. Evidence for this appears in the inclusion of Jīlū in the title of the metropolitan of Salamas around 1552, and the copying of a manuscript in the village of Naze north of Urmia in 1563 by the priest Paul of Oramar. Additionally, many Chaldean families in the Urmia region trace their ancestry to settlers originally from Jīlū. Among the most well known are the Malek-Yonan family of Geogtapa, who are descended from a Jīlū chieftain who founded the village in the 16th century. He also built a church there dedicated to St. Zayʿā which he set with stones brought from the original church in Jīlū.

Later in the 16th century, many inhabitants from Jīlū returned to rebuild their homes and churches. Those of Zêrīnī found the church of St. 'Azīzā in ruins and, after rebuilding it, they acquired a text of the saint's legend from the town of Bakhdida in the Nineveh Plains.

=== 16th-17th century ===
Since the 16th century, and probably even earlier, the village of Mātā d-ʿUmrā d-Mār Zayʿā was the seat of a metropolitan bishop of the Church of the East. The diocese of this metropolitan bishop included the Hakkari districts of Jīlū, Baz, Tkhuma, Chāl (modern-day Çukurca), Ţāl, and Rékān.

The first historical mention of the diocese of Jīlū is from 1580, when the metropolitan of Jīlū, Siirt and Salamas, was elevated to the patriarchate of the Chaldean Catholic Church as Mār Shim'on IX Dinha (1580-1600). That year the new patriarch consecrated a metropolitan for Jīlū named Mār Sargīs, who was among the signatories of a letter from him to Pope Gregory XIII, and he is probably the same as the Metropolitan Mār Sargīs of Jīlū mentioned in hierarchies listed in the reports of 1607 and 1610 sent by Catholic patriarch Mār Shim'on X Eliyā (1600-1638) to Pope Paul V.

In 1610 also, the large village of Sāţ is recorded as being the residence of bishop named Mār Gīwargīs, who was probably a suffragan of Mār Sargīs. The report of 1610 also mentioned that the Malik of Jīlū was named David, and he commanded 4,000 fighting men; the Malik of Ishtāzin was named 'Caitar', and he was in charge of 500 fighters; and Sāţ was led by a man named 'Chartus', probably also a Malik, who in his turn commanded 300 fighters.

In the late 17th century the diocese severed its ties with Catholicism, along with the rest of the Qudshānis patriarchate, and returned to being traditionalist. The metropolitan bishops of Jīlū were usually nominated from the same clan and all bore the hereditary title Mār Sargīs. An exception to this appears to have been the patriarch Mār Shim'on XV Michael Mukhattas (1740-1780), who is said to have been metropolitan of Jīlū before being elevated to the patriarchate and, indeed, the Cathedral of Sts. Zayʿā and Tāwor is commonly held to have served at certain times as the residence of the patriarchs of that line.

It is during this period that a new line of bishops belonging to the same clan as the metropolitans of Jīlū, Bé-Yagmālā, was established at the village of Gāgawran (modern-day Aksu) in the nearby Gāwār plain. These distant blood-relatives, who took the name Mār Slīvā, probably began as suffragans of Mār Sargīs and are first mentioned in a manuscript colophon from 1743.

=== 19th century ===
Nineteenth-century bishop Mār Yawsip Sargīs was described by Sir Austen Henry Layard, who met him at the village of Nahrā in late August 1849, as "... a young man of lofty stature and handsome countenance..." and likened his look to that of a hunter or warrior.

In 1891 he was visited by British explorer and writer Isabella Bird, who described him as "a magnificent-looking man with a superb gray beard, the beau-ideal of an Oriental ecclesiastic."

This bishop was approached by the Chaldean Catholic Church in 1890 and 1895, but on both occasions he refused to convert to Catholicism. It is around this time that the inhabitants of the large and isolated village of Sāţ converted to the Catholicism in their entirety.

Metropolitan Bishops of Jīlū
Name	Birth	Consecration	Death
Mār Yawsip Sargīs	1819, Mātā d-ʿUmrā d-Mār Zayʿā	1839, Qudshānis	1899, Mātā d-ʿUmrā d-Mār Zayʿā
Mār Zayʿā Sargīs	29 July 1888, Mātā d-ʿUmrā d-Mār Zayʿā	5 July 1900, Qudshānis	12 May 1951, Baghdad
Mār Īshoʿ Sargīs	1911, Mātā d-ʿUmrā d-Mār Zayʿā	14 May 1951, Baghdad	19 December 1966, London (buried at St. Zayʿā Cathedral in Karrādat Maryam, Baghdad)
Mar Yawsip Sargis	1950 Baghdad	2 March 1967, Baghdad	Currently residing in Modesto, California

=== 20th century, post-genocide ===
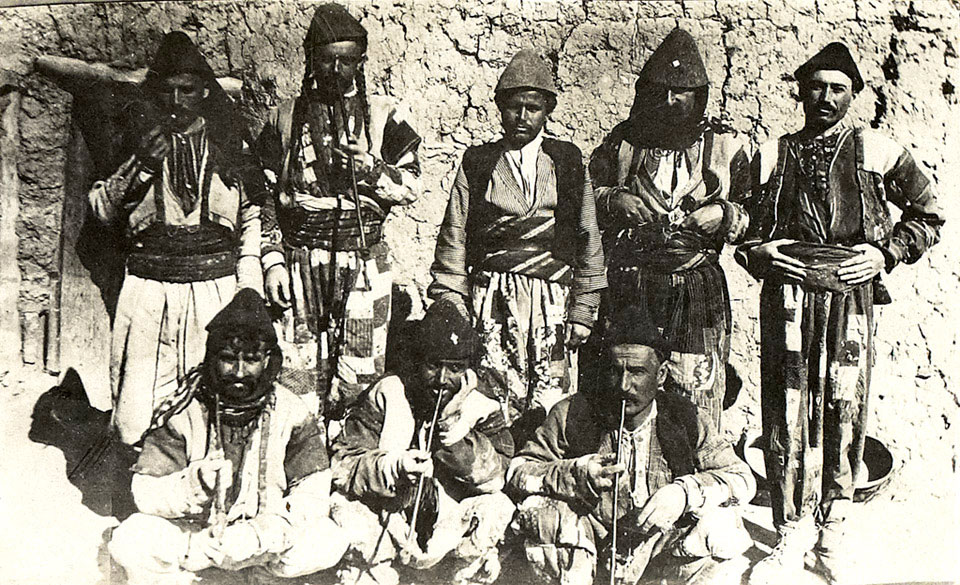
Assyrian Jilu fighters 1918

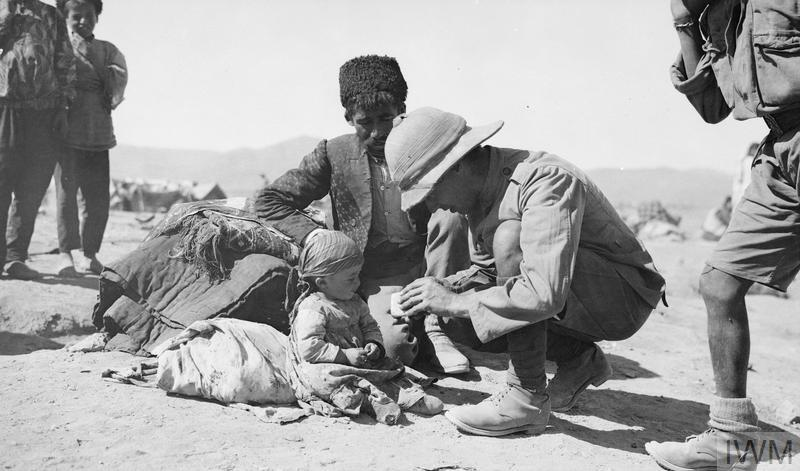
British soldier helping Jilu Assyrian refugees Baqubah Camp

The last of these metropolitan bishops to reside at Mātā d-Mār Zayʿā was Mār Zayʿā Sargīs, who was consecrated at 11 years of age. During the Assyrian genocide the bishop moved to the Salamas district between 1915 and 1918, then remained at the Baqubah refugee camp between 1918 and 1920, before moving to Mosul in 1920. From 1921 onward his see was fixed at the village of Khirshéniyah, immediately to the northwest of Alqosh in the Dohuk Governorate, where a small church was built dedicated to St. Zayʿā. Then in 1941 his see was moved to Baghdad, where a large Jīlū émigré community existed at Camp al-Sikak (the "Railroads Camp") with a mud-brick church dedicated to St. Zayʿā built in the 1920s.

After the Iraqi revolution in 1958, a new Cathedral dedicated to St. Zayʿā was built at Karrādat Maryam, with large contributions in money and in kind from Jīlū entrepreneurs Lira and Supar. On 24 June 1959 the new cathedral was dedicated by Metropolitan Mar Yawsip Khnanishu and Bishop Mār Īshoʿ Sargīs. This dedication was marked by the attendance of high-profile officials, among them the new Iraqi president Abd al-Karim Qasim, as well as other religious leaders.

In the mid-1980s the cathedral was appropriated by the Iraqi government, which planned to turn the surrounding area into a restricted area. In return, a parcel of land was given in the Mechanics' quarter (Hayy al-Mīkānīk) of Dora, Baghdad. A new cathedral was built there and dedicated in 1986, forming the only parish of the "diocese of Baghdad" to which the current bishop from this line, Mar Yawsip Sargis, was assigned. In 2002 the bishop left for the United States and has since been unable to return to his diocese. He currently resides in exile at Modesto, California. For many years after the 2003 invasion of Iraq the cathedral in Baghdad was closed, reopening in 2009. With the death of the resident parish priest in 2011, the cathedral is no longer used for regular worship.

=== Legend and Tradition ===
According to Lalayan (Assyrians of the Van District, 1914), there was an oral legend concerning the origins and history of the Maliks of Greater Jīlū. The tradition is probably full of historical errors, but must have some element of truth to it.

It narrates that a man named Mandū, from the clan of "Nebuchadnezzar," for some unknown reason set out from the city of Āthor (Mosul), traveling in the company of his four brothers: Bārut, Yôsip, Bākus and Issé. Mandū had promised that he would settle in a place where they could feed him the head and shanks of a sheep (a dish called pāchā). After a long journey Mandū and his brothers arrived at a place named Pāchū, where a poor man fed them pāchā. Mandū observed that he had reached his destination and decided to stay there and become the head of that district. He chose a good place, later known as Zārānīsh (Zêrīnī), just opposite from Pāchū. There he built a house for himself.

One day as Mandū was walking in the forest, he saw four birds but did not know from where they had come. He also saw a black stone, and nearby, a locked church. In his dream that night he saw the key to the church and a candelabra buried under the black stone. The next morning he went and found the key under the black stone, opened the church and entered it to pray. From that day that church became a place for worship for all the residents of the village. One day, as Mandū was walking according to his habit, he saw a large cave filled with human bones. He inquired and was told that some people had escaped from the Persians and had hidden themselves in this cave. The Persians found the cave and lit a fire before its entry, killing those inside it.

Around the village there used to live some pagans who Mandū converted to Christianity, killing those who refused to. Mandū did not molest those from four well-known families though, and ordered them to go and live in a nearby village. They went as ordered and their descendants still remained for some time but did not increase. Each had remained one family only. Descendants of Malik Mandū became Maliks of Greater Jīlū, and also took the name of Mandū.

The same tradition recounts that during the reign of one of the Maliks, the Mar Shim'on (Catholicos-Patriarch of the Church of the East) fled from Āthor (Mosul) and sought refuge in Alqosh. The Persians then came and conquered the area and took Mār Shim'on to Persia, permitting him to live in the town of Ushnū, where he settled as a refugee and built a large cathedral. After a while Malik Mandū is said to have freed Mār Shim'on from the Persians and brought him to Zêrīnī. For 60 years after that time the Mār Shim'ons lived in Zêrīnī. The grave of one of them was even said to be located in the village cemetery. It is not clear why they left Zêrīnī and settled in the village of Tirqônis, and later in Qudshānis, which was given to them as a gift by Malik Mandū. They did not stay long in Qudshānis either because the village was near Julamerk, and prone to the raids of its Kurdish Emir (prince).

He was therefore obliged to move to the district of Dīzan. Malik Mandū was not pleased that Mār Shim'on had left Qudshānis. He conferred with the Kurdish Emir of Julamerk on how he could return Mār Shim'on to Qudshānis. He went to Dīzan and burned Mār Shim'on's residence near the village of Rabbān Dād-Īsho'. Later they collected money and built a new one for him in Qudshānis, and invited him to live in it. In this manner Mār Shim'on was made to accept the invitation to go and settle in Qudshānis.

It continues to tell that the 'throne' of Malik Mandū was inherited by Malik Ahron. He attacked the Kurdish castle of Khirwāt (modern-day Hirvata near the Gawar Plain), took it and destroyed it. It was a great victory. Malik Ahron was followed by another who took the name Mandū. He also, like former Maliks, was a man of war. When there was a conflict with Malik Khubyar of Bāz, he attacked the district and killed a number of its inhabitants. Malik Mandū was followed by Malik Sulaymān and during his reign the Ottoman Government thought it was necessary to post its representatives in those parts. The Government appointed a local Rayyis (Chief) each in Julamerk, Gawar, and Shamdinan (Shamsdin). These Chiefs tried in every way to prevent fighting between the various tribes in the area. Therefore, Malik Sulaymān and Malik Shlëmun who followed him, both had kept peace among the other tribes.

Malik Shlëmun was followed by Malik Wardā. It was said that he was bribed by the Kurdish chief of Oramar, not to aid the Assyrian tribes of Dīzan, Ţyāré, Tkhūmā when they were attacked by Kurdish Emir Badr Khān Beg of Bohtan and his allies. During the massacres of Badr Khan the Kurds attacked, plundered, killed and stole their cattle, but Malik Wardā did not interfere to defend the Assyrian tribes. Malik Īshū, who followed Malik Wardā, attacked the Assyrian Tkhuma Tribe and took away 2,000 head of sheep. After that the tribe of Dīzan attacked Tkhūmā, occupied the lands of Qarāsū, and put their own cattle in their planted fields. Malik Īshū attacked the Dīzan tribe, and took their cattle. He then controlled their fields and collected their farming produce for himself.

Malik Īshū was followed by Malik Mirzā. Nothing is known about this Malik. During the time of Malik Khālil who followed Malik Mirzā, Kurdish tribes attacked Jīlū tribes and stole 2,000 head of sheep. Malik Khālil complained to the Ottoman government, later taking 400 strongmen from his tribe and 40 Turkish soldiers to attack the Kurdish chief of Oramar. He was forced to pay Malik Khālil 200 Liras, 682 sheep, seven mules, four cows, and some carpets and other things. Afterwards, in 1909 Malik Khālil traveled to Europe to collect money. He was dressed in his native clothes and was introduced into the presence of Pope Pius X. He explained to the Pope that he was Malik of Jīlū and added that there was no education in his country and requested Pope's permission to collect money to open schools.

The Pope gave his permission and in a short time he collected 18,000 Vatican Liras and returned home where he began to build a school building. He again went back to Europe to collect money. It appeared that he was impersonating a Catholic monk in his travels in Germany. As Lalayan had learned from a German Consul he knew, the German Government arrested Malik Khālil since they suspected him of fraud, i.e. collecting money for himself in the name of the Church, and he had requested the Consul to introduce him personally to German Government!

Lalayan (Assyrians of the Van District, 1914), also recounts the oral legend concerning the origins and history of the Maliks of Lesser Jīlū. It narrates that Malik Zāmū, considered the head of his clan, along with his brother Bayrijjé and their relatives, had come from the village of Ţirnākhīr in the Bohtān region and settled in the village of Ţelānā in Greater Jīlū. They had been exiled from their former homes by Kurds. Several Maliks inherited his position. One of the Maliks made strong kinship ties with one of the well-known families of Ţelānā by giving his daughter in marriage to one of their sons. It is not known when they settled in Zīr. From this clan was born a strongman named Aro, who later brought Ţelānā under his rule, and assumed the title and authority of Malik. He was succeeded by his son Malik Gewargīs, and then his grandson Malik Khammū, of whom nothing particular is known.

== Notable Jīlū Assyrians ==
- Margaret George Shello (1942–1969)

Peshmerga combat woman, Kurdistan Democratic Party Activist, and commander of a guerrilla unit during the First Iraqi–Kurdish War (1961–1970). Also known as "Daya Kurdistan" (the mother of Kurdistan).

- Fadi Merza Be-Gulawi

World champion Muay Thai kickboxer

- Malik Andrious

Malik of Greater Jilu in the early 1920s. He was deported with Catholicos-Patriarch Shimun XXI Eshai of the Assyrian Church of the East to Cyprus in 1933 after the Simele massacre.

- Malik Qambar

Malik Qambar was a Catholic-Assyrian national leader and general of the Assyro-Chaldean battalion formed in 1920 as part of the French Foreign Legion.

== See also ==
- List of Assyrian tribes
- List of Assyrian settlements
- Assyrian Church of the East
- Dioceses of the Church of the East to 1318
- Dioceses of the Church of the East, 1318–1552
- Dioceses of the Church of the East after 1552
- Tyari
- Gawar
- Nochiya
- Arosh and Halmon
- Öveç, Şemdinli
- Beyyurdu, Şemdinli

== Sources ==
- Chabot, Jean-Baptiste (1902). Synodicon orientale ou recueil de synodes nestoriens (PDF). Paris: Imprimerie Nationale.
- Coakley, J.F. (1992). The Church of the East and the Church of England: A History of the Archbishop of Canterbury's Assyrian Mission. Oxford: Clarendon Press. ISBN 9780198267447.
