= Nochiya =

Assyrian tribe

The Nochiya (Syriac: ܢܵܘܟ̰ܝܼܵܐ, pl.: Nochiyaye,) are an Assyrian tribe that were based in and around the villages of Beyyurdu and Öveç in the Şemdinli district of the province of Hakkari, Turkey.

== People ==
The Assyrians of the Nochiya Region were simple farmers who owned cattle and grew food. They were known particularly for their fine tobacco, which was their main source of income along with herding sheep. Prayer and fasting were strictly observed in the villages of the Nochiya Assyrians. An Englishman visiting the Nochiya Region in the late 19th century noted that "there is perhaps no Assyrian district where simple piety and loyal devotion to the church of their fathers is more beautifully seen than in Nochiya". Nochiyaye were and are still today most famous for their Eastern Rite faith and for being the guardians of the Assyrian Church of the East's canon laws, which they have preserved.

== Religion ==
There were at least six monasteries and more than 40 churches within the Nochiya Region. The Nochiyaye were best known for their adherence to the Assyrian Church of the East faith; because of this, religious customs such as Lent and prayer were strictly observed. The Mar Ishu Monastery in the village of Mar Ishu was a theological school for priests and was run by the Metropolitans of Shamizdin, who would not tolerate any changes to the church's canon laws.

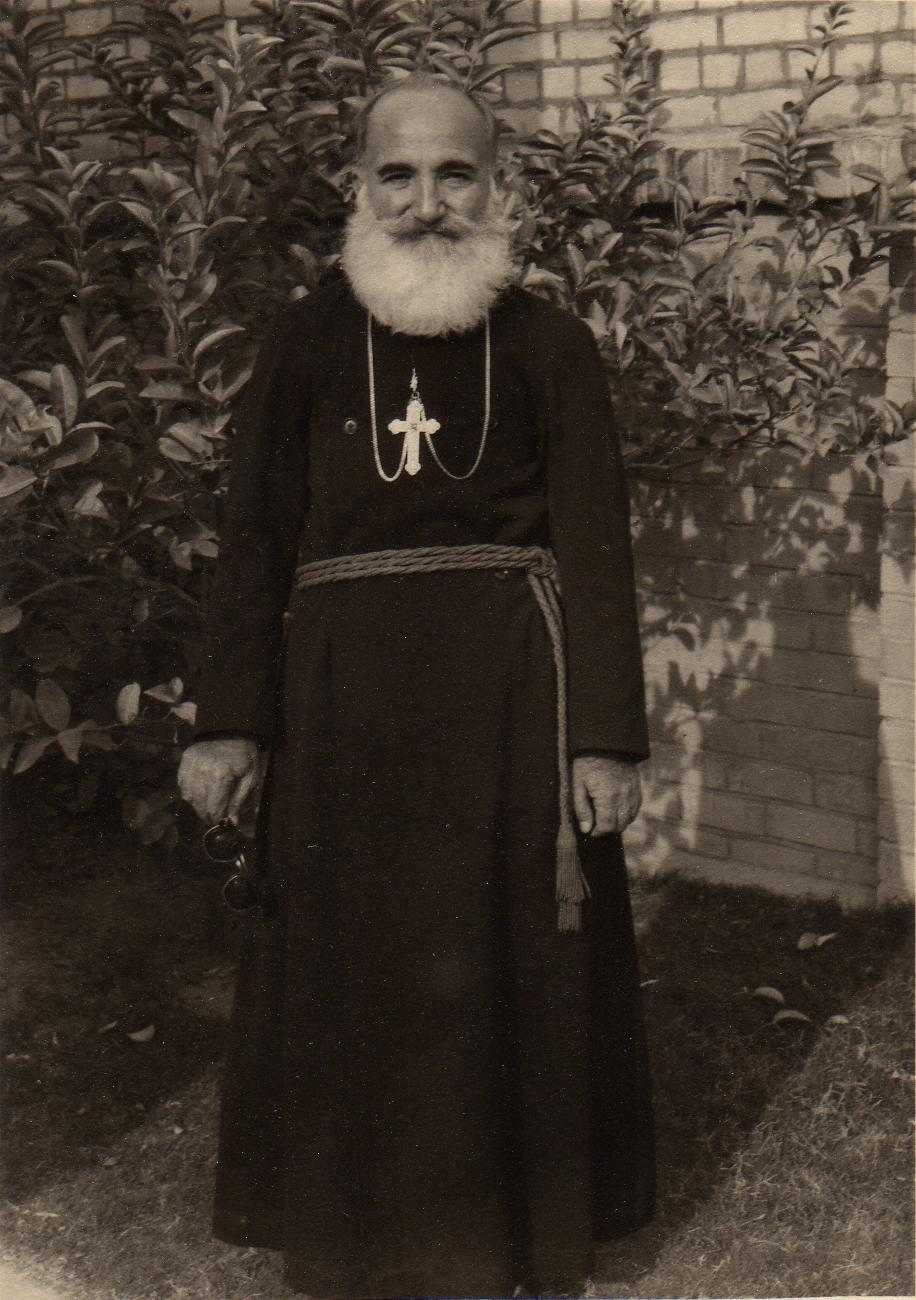
Mar Yosip Khnanisho at his home in Baghdad, Iraq

An Englishman visiting the Nochiya Region in the late 19th century noted that "there is perhaps no Assyrian district where simple piety and loyal devotion to the church of their fathers is more beautifully seen than Nochiya".

There were other important religious figures in the tribe, including two bishops, four archdeacons, twelve priests, and a large number of deacons distributed among the clans. To this day, the majority of the priests and deacons within the Assyrian Church of the East belong to the Nochiya tribe, including the Patriarch Mar Dinkha IV.

=== Saint Mar Yosip Khnanisho ===
The 12th and the last of the metropolitans the Matran family donated to the church was Mar Yosip Khnanisho, who died on July 3, 1977, in Baghdad, Iraq. At an early age, he was aware for the sublime position he was dedicated, thus he had learned by heart the complete Eucharistic rites, performed in the church by a deacon or priest. He was tutored adequately by a learned scholar, Rev. Rehana, his father's uncle, who was well versed in the Aramaic, Russian and Turkish languages and an authority in Eastern theology. Rev. Rehana was the head of the Seminary in Mar Ishu Monastery and he taught classes to a number of students studying for the priesthood. From this seminary many graduated to become bishops and priests in various dioceses and parishes.

At age twelve, Khnanisho was ordained a deacon. By 1912 Khnanisho had already acquired a thorough knowledge of theology therefore he was found to be well suited to be ordained a priest. In the year 1914, at the beginning of World War I, he was sent as a delegate, representing the Metropolitan Mar Iskhaq Khnanisho, to participate in a most important meeting called by Mar Benyamin Shimon XIX, the Catholicos Patriarch at the patriarchal cell in Qudchanis, Turkey, to discuss the effects of the World War on the Church and the nation and prepare for the changes that were expected to take place. While there he was consecrated a bishop on August 10, 1914, by the patriarch and was appointed as assistant to the patriarch.

He remained in Qudchanis until 1916 when the Assyrians had to leave their homeland and possessions in consequence of the Great War. After the treacherous assassination of the Patriarch Mar Benyamin Shimon XIX by Kurds during Sayfo in 1918, Khnanisho assumed to a great extent, the leadership of the nation, until the Assyrians arrived in the refugee camps, set up by the Red Cross and League of Nations, at Baqubah, Iraq in 1918. In December 1918 he was elevated to the rank of Metropolitan in Baghdad by Patriarch Mar Paulos Shimon XX.

When Shimun XXI Eshai, the Catholicos Patriarch, was exiled in 1933 by the monarchial regime of Iraq, Khnanisho was entrusted with the church administration in Iraq and the Middle East.

In 1973, when Shimun XXI Eshai resigned his position as the Catholicos Patriarch, Khnanisho was vested with responsibilities of administering the Church of the East throughout the world. At the same time, the Iraqi government issued a Republican decree appointing Khnanisho as the supreme head of all the Assyrians in Iraq.

On July 3, 1977, at 1:10 pm Khnanisho died in Baghdad, Iraq. His death coincides with the feast celebrated every year in memory of St. Thomas the Apostle.

== Notable Nochiyaye ==
=== Religious Figures ===
- Assyrian Church of the East:
  - Saint Mar Yosip Khnanisho - Mar Ishu, NOCHIYA - Last Metropolitan of Shamizdin, d.1977, Baghdad
  - Mar Dinkha IV - Darbandokeh, Iraq - Patriarch
  - Mar Emmanuel Yosip - Darbandokeh, Iraq - Bishop, Diocese of Canada

=== Political Activists ===
- Dr. Emanuel Kamber - Darbandokeh, Iraq - Previous Secretary General, Assyrian Universal Alliance, Chicago
- Kurdistan Democratic Party:
  - Fawzi Hariri - Harir, Iraq - ‘Iraqi Minister for Industry' & 'Elected INC Member'
  - Sargis Aghajan - Diyana, Iraq

=== Others ===
- Geniro - Tees, - Darbandokeh, Pop Singer, Canada brother of Ninos Dikho

== See also ==
- Jilu
- Tyari
- Halmon
- Ashitha
