= Anadağ, Derecik =

Village in Hakkari Province, Turkey

Anadağ
- Village
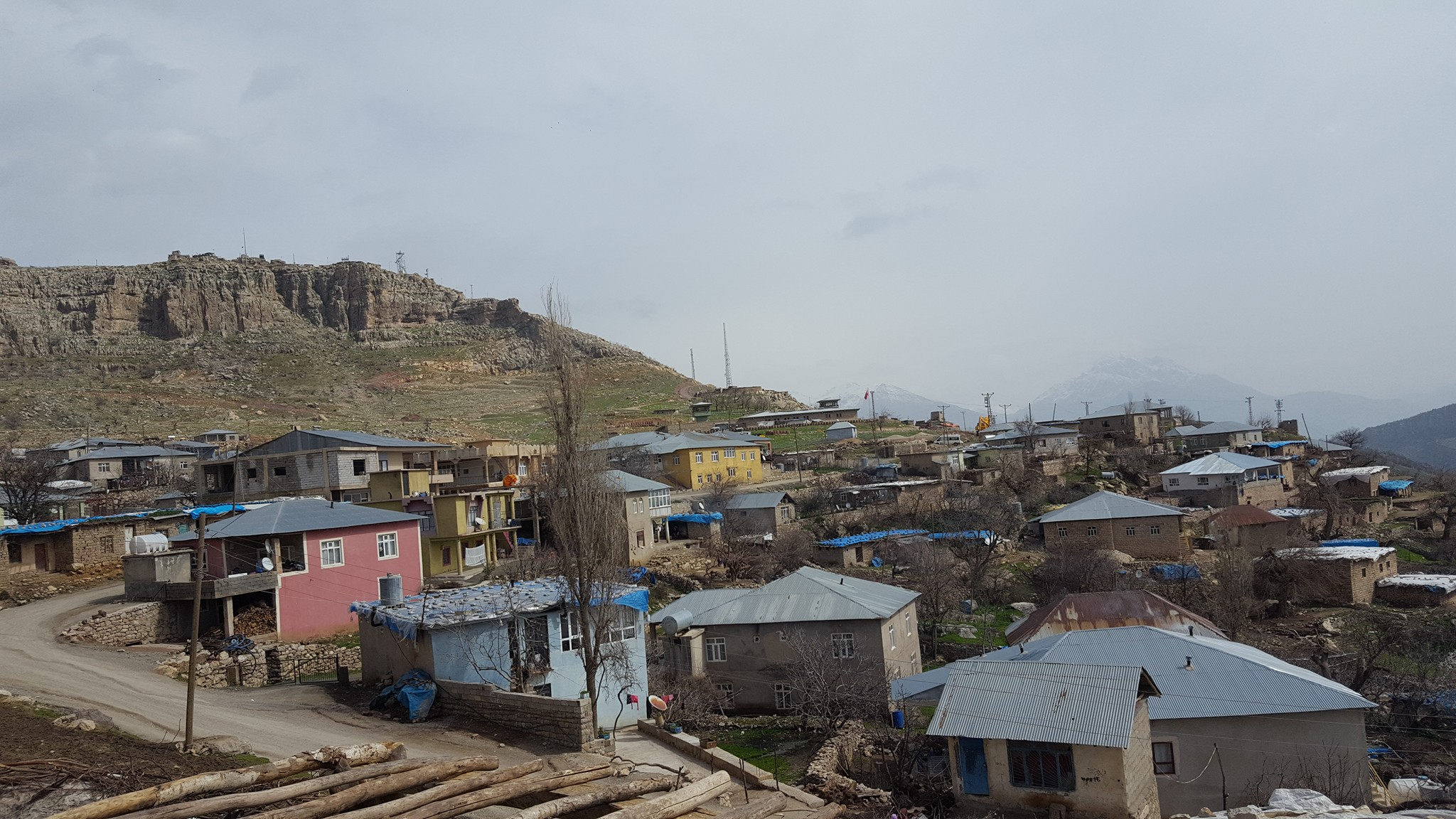

- Location within Turkey
- Coordinates: 37.006°N 44.301°E
- Country: Turkey
- Province: Hakkâri
- District: Derecik
- Population (2023): 4,363
- Time zone: UTC+3 (TRT)

Anadağ (Kurdish: Bêruh) is a village in Derecik District in Hakkâri Province in Turkey. The village is populated by Kurds of the Gerdî tribe and had a population of 4,363 in 2023. Anadağ has the five hamlets of Bağlıca (Mamreşan), Beşikağaç (Nihave), Bölek (Serekanî), Gökçetaş (Musekan) and Yeşilova (Îsyan), attached to it. Three of these hamlets are unpopulated.

== History ==
It was attached to Şemdinli District before becoming part of the newly created Derecik District in 2018.

On 24 August 2015, an M_{w} 39 earthquake centered on the village struck the area.

== Geography ==
The village is 204 kilometers away from the city center of Hakkari, and it is 19.5 kilometers away from the district center of Derecik.

== Population ==
Population history of the village from 1997 to 2023:

Population
| Year | Pop. | ±% |
|---|---|---|
| 1997 | 1,209 | — |
| 2007 | 2,632 | +117.7% |
| 2012 | 3,256 | +23.7% |
| 2017 | 4,290 | +31.8% |
| 2022 | 4,259 | −0.7% |
| 2023 | 4,363 | +2.4% |
