= Uslu, Derecik =

Village in Hakkari Province, Turkey

Uslu
- Village
- Location within Turkey
- Coordinates: 37.112°N 44.379°E
- Country: Turkey
- Province: Hakkâri
- District: Derecik
- Population (2023): 1,645
- Time zone: UTC+3 (TRT)

Uslu (Kurdish: Hordin) is a village in Derecik District in Hakkâri Province in Turkey. The village is populated by Kurds of the Gerdî tribe and had a population of 1,645 in 2023.

Uslu has the hamlets of Akören (Bêşan) and Taşlıçay (Çemena geli) attached to it.

It was attached to Şemdinli District before becoming part of the newly created Derecik District in 2018.

== Population ==
Population history of the village from 2016 to 2023:

Population
Year	Pop.	±%
2016	2,014	—
2017	2,045	+1.5%
2018	2,048	+0.1%
2019	2,158	+5.4%
2020	2,208	+2.3%
2021	2,221	+0.6%
2022	2,247	+1.2%
2023	1,645	−26.8%
