= Derecik =

Derecik may refer to:

- Derecik, Arhavi
- Derecik, Hakkâri
- Derecik District, Hakkâri Province
- Derecik, Muş
- Derecik, Mustafakemalpaşa
