= Ortaklar, Derecik =

Village in Hakkari Province, Turkey

Ortaklar
- Village
- Location in Turkey
- Coordinates: 37.171°N 44.413°E
- Country: Turkey
- Province: Hakkâri
- District: Derecik
- Population (2023): 1,937
- Time zone: UTC+3 (TRT)

Ortaklar (Kurdish: Bêsusin) is a village in Derecik District in Hakkâri Province in Turkey. The village is populated by Kurds of the Begzade and Gerdî tribes and had a population of 1,937 in 2023.

The two hamlets of Ormancık (Bêgalte) and Örencik (Benavok) are attached to it. Örencik is unpopulated.

It was attached to Şemdinli District before becoming part of the newly created Derecik District in 2018.

== Population ==
Population history of the village from 1997 to 2023:

Population
Year	Pop.	±%
1997	906	—
2007	1,184	+30.7%
2012	1,357	+14.6%
2017	2,401	+76.9%
2022	1,569	−34.7%
2023	1,937	+23.5%
