= Gelişen, Derecik =

Village in Hakkari Province, Turkey

Gelişen
- Village
- Location in Turkey
- Coordinates: 37.117°N 44.426°E
- Country: Turkey
- Province: Hakkâri
- District: Derecik
- Population (2023): 4,134
- Time zone: UTC+3 (TRT)

Gelişen (Kurdish: Gerdî Şapatan) is a village in Derecik District in Hakkâri Province in Turkey. The village is populated by Kurds of the Gerdî tribe and had a population of 4,134 in 2023.

The village has the nine hamlets of Adıgüzel, Aralık (Parewê), Beğendik, Karakoç (Sunê), Koryürek (Bêgijnê), Kütüklu (Zewyarezi), Mordağ (Dêrkê), Suçıktı (Bêlutyan) and Toklu attached to it.

== History ==
The village was attached to Şemdinli District before becoming part of the newly-created Derecik District in 2018.

== Name ==
The name Şepatan (Shepātān) may be connected to the word Sciabatan mentioned by Assemani.

== Population ==
Population history of the village from 1997 to 2023:

Population
Year	Pop.	±%
1997	2,402	—
2007	4,061	+69.1%
2012	5,679	+39.8%
2017	3,988	−29.8%
2022	4,122	+3.4%
2023	4,134	+0.3%
