= Attacks on Dağlıca and Iğdır =

Kurdish militant suicide bombing in Istanbul, Turkey

Attacks of Dağlıca and Iğdır
- Part of the Kurdish-Turkish conflict (1978-present)
- Location: Dağlıca and Iğdır, Turkey
- Date: 6 September and 8 September 2015
- Attack type: bombings
- Deaths: 16 Soldiers: 14 police officers
- Injuries: 2 police officers
- Perpetrator: Kurdistan Workers' Party (allegedly)

The Attacks in Dağlıca and Iğdır took place on 6 and 8 September 2015 in the Turkish provinces of Hakkâri and Iğdır. Sixteen soldiers and 14 police officers were killed in explosive attacks carried out allegedly by the Kurdistan Workers' Party (PKK). These incidents marked the deadliest assaults by the PKK following the breakdown of the ceasefire in July 2015.

== Attacks ==
On 6 September 2015, an explosive attacks on a Turkish army convoy took place on a road between Dağlıca and Yüksekova, which was first to be freed from mines and explosive devices. According to the Turkish government, two armoured vehicles were badly damaged, 16 soldiers were killed and six others were injured.

Two days later, on 6 September another explosive attacks was carried out on a minibus with police officers on a road near Hasanhan in Aralık. The police accompanied customs officials on their way to the checkpoint in Dilucu on the border with Azerbaijan. The attack killed 14 police officers, two others were injured.

== Reactions ==
Prime Minister Ahmet Davutoğlu summoned an emergency security conference in Ankara together with Chief of Staff Hulusi Akar and Intelligence Chief Hakan Fidan, the results of which were not made public. Davutoğlu announced "decisive action" against the PKK and spoke of a liberation of the mountains in northern Iraq from terrorists. President Recep Tayyip Erdoğan stated that "such attacks were aimed at destroying the well-being, security and stability of the country". In response to the attack, Selahattin Demirtaş broke off his visit to Germany and called for a ceasefire on both sides.
