= Çevre, Şemdinli =

Village in Hakkari Province, Turkey

Çevre
- Village
- Location within Turkey
- Coordinates: 37.369°N 44.329°E
- Country: Turkey
- Province: Hakkâri
- District: Şemdinli
- Population (1997): 0
- Time zone: UTC+3 (TRT)

Çevre (Kurdish: Bay) is an unpopulated village in the Şemdinli District in Hakkâri Province in Turkey. The village was previously populated by Kurds of the Humaru tribe.

== History ==
The village had a population of 355 in 1967 and 724 in 1990. According to Vital Cuinet, the villagers were from the Hakkari tribe who were related to the people in the other Bay village in the area.

== Population ==
Population history from 1967 to 2023:

Population
Year	Pop.	±% p.a.
1967	355	—
1990	724	+3.15%
1997	0	−100.00%

== See also ==
- Ayranlı
