= Yaylapınar, Şemdinli =

Village in Hakkari Province, Turkey

Yaylapınar
- Village
- Location within Turkey
- Coordinates: 37.24°N 44.448°E
- Country: Turkey
- Province: Hakkâri
- District: Şemdinli
- Population (2023): 849
- Time zone: UTC+3 (TRT)

Yaylapınar (Kurdish: Salaran) is a village in the Şemdinli District in Hakkâri Province in Turkey. The village is populated by Kurds of the Herkî tribe and had a population of 849 in 2023.

== Population ==
Population history from 1997 to 2023:

Population
Year	Pop.	±%
1997	515	—
2007	801	+55.5%
2010	860	+7.4%
2015	910	+5.8%
2020	940	+3.3%
2023	849	−9.7%
