= Konur, Şemdinli =

Village in Hakkari Province, Turkey

Konur
- Village
- Location within Turkey
- Coordinates: 37.260°N 44.342°E
- Country: Turkey
- Province: Hakkâri
- District: Şemdinli
- Population (2023): 1,310
- Time zone: UTC+3 (TRT)

Konur (Kurdish: Nixayilan) is a village in the Şemdinli District in Hakkâri Province in Turkey. The village is populated by Kurds of the Herkî tribe and had a population of 1,310 in 2023.

The two hamlets Aktütün (Bêzelê) and Dereyanı (Gûlkan) are attached to the village.

== Population ==
Population history from 1997 to 2023:

Population
Year	Pop.	±%
1997	860	—
2007	1,058	+23.0%
2010	1,106	+4.5%
2015	1,532	+38.5%
2020	1,490	−2.7%
2023	1,310	−12.1%
