= Günyazı, Şemdinli =

Village in Hakkari Province, Turkey

Günyazı
- Village
- Location within Turkey
- Coordinates: 37.287°N 44.597°E
- Country: Turkey
- Province: Hakkâri
- District: Şemdinli
- Population (2023): 1,451
- Time zone: UTC+3 (TRT)

Günyazı (Kurdish: Qelaşk) is a village in the Şemdinli District in Hakkâri Province in Turkey. The village is populated by Kurds of the Zerzan tribe and had a population of 1,451 in 2023.

The hamlets of Olgunlar (Bêbap) and Yeniceli (Şeyhan) are attached to the village. Çalışkanlar was a hamlet of Günyazı until 2022.

== Population ==
Population history from 1997 to 2023:

Population
Year	Pop.	±%
1997	2,804	—
2007	4,196	+49.6%
2010	4,354	+3.8%
2015	2,696	−38.1%
2020	2,808	+4.2%
2023	1,451	−48.3%
