= Boğazköy, Şemdinli =

Village in Hakkari Province, Turkey

Boğazköy
- Village
- Location within Turkey
- Coordinates: 37.278°N 44.432°E
- Country: Turkey
- Province: Hakkâri
- District: Şemdinli
- Population (2023): 1,052
- Time zone: UTC+3 (TRT)

Boğazköy (Kurdish: Bêgoza) is a village in the Şemdinli District in Hakkâri Province in Turkey. The village is populated by Kurds of the Herkî tribe and had a population of 1,052 in 2023.

The hamlets of Çiçekli and Kayacık are attached to the village.

It is a tobacco-producing village.

== Population ==
Population history from 1997 to 2023:

Population
Year	Pop.	±%
1997	484	—
2007	831	+71.7%
2010	903	+8.7%
2015	1,125	+24.6%
2020	1,240	+10.2%
2023	1,052	−15.2%
