= Çatalca (disambiguation) =

Çatalca is a municipality and district of Istanbul Province, Turkey.

Çatalca may also refer to:

- Çatalca Peninsula, peninsula in european part of Turkey, west of Bosphorus

Following settlements in Turkey:

- Çatalca, Kızıltepe, a neighbourhood in Mardin Province
- Çatalca, Nizip, a neighbourhood in Gaziantep Province
- Çatalca, Şemdinli, a village in Hakkâri Province
- Çatalca, Tarsus, a neighbourhood in Mersin Province
