= Uğuraçan, Şemdinli =

Village in Hakkari Province, Turkey

Uğuraçan
- Village
- Location within Turkey
- Coordinates: 37.255°N 44.361°E
- Country: Turkey
- Province: Hakkâri
- District: Şemdinli
- Population (2023): 743
- Time zone: UTC+3 (TRT)

Uğuraçan (Kurdish: Betkar) is a village in the Şemdinli District in Hakkâri Province in Turkey. The village is populated by Kurds of the Herkî tribe and had a population of 743 in 2023.

The hamlet Yeşilbayır (Bêzeno) is attached to Uğuraçan.

== Population ==
Population history from 1997 to 2023:

Population
Year	Pop.	±%
1997	657	—
2007	827	+25.9%
2010	864	+4.5%
2015	836	−3.2%
2020	840	+0.5%
2023	743	−11.5%
