= Meşelik, Şemdinli =

Village in Hakkari Province, Turkey

Meşelik
- Village
- Location within Turkey
- Coordinates: 37.245°N 44.265°E
- Country: Turkey
- Province: Hakkâri
- District: Şemdinli
- Population (1997): 0
- Time zone: UTC+3 (TRT)

Meşelik (Kurdish: Herkî) is an unpopulated village in the Şemdinli District in Hakkâri Province in Turkey. The village was previously populated by Kurds of the Herkî tribe.

The hamlet of Yaman (Zîzan) is attached to the village.

== History ==
Population history from 1985 to 2023:

Population
Year	Pop.	±% p.a.
1985	324	—
1990	66	−27.26%
1997	0	−100.00%
