= Çubuklu, Şemdinli =

Village in Hakkari Province, Turkey

Çubuklu
- Village
- Location within Turkey
- Coordinates: 37.298°N 44.467°E
- Country: Turkey
- Province: Hakkâri
- District: Şemdinli
- Population (2023): 315
- Time zone: UTC+3 (TRT)

Çubuklu (Kurdish: Bêntûr) is a village in the Şemdinli District in Hakkâri Province in Turkey. The village is populated by Kurds of the Humaru tribe and had a population of 315 in 2023.

== Population ==
Population history from 1997 to 2023:

Population
Year	Pop.	±% p.a.
1997	323	—
2007	332	+0.28%
2010	316	−1.63%
2015	306	−0.64%
2020	285	−1.41%
2023	315	+3.39%
