= Altınsu, Şemdinli =

Village in Hakkari Province, Turkey

Altınsu
- Village
- Location within Turkey
- Coordinates: 37.322°N 44.552°E
- Country: Turkey
- Province: Hakkâri
- District: Şemdinli
- Population (2023): 4,931
- Time zone: UTC+3 (TRT)

Altınsu (Kurdish: Şapatan; Syriac: Shāpūṭ) is a village in the Şemdinli District in Hakkâri Province in Turkey. The village is populated by Kurds of the Zerzan tribe and had a population of 4,931 in 2023. The hamlet of İncesu (Seraro) is attached to the village.

The village is mainly engaged in agriculture.

== History ==
Shāpūṭ (today called Altınsu) was inhabited by 20 Church of the East Christian families in 1877 when visited by Edward Lewes Cutts and was served by one functioning church as part of the archdiocese of Shemsdin.

== Population ==
Population history from 1997 to 2023:

Population
Year	Pop.	±%
1997	2,285	—
2007	3,681	+61.1%
2010	4,036	+9.6%
2015	4,490	+11.2%
2020	4,828	+7.5%
2023	4,931	+2.1%

== Bibliography ==
- Erdost, Muzaffer İlhan (1993). Şemdinli röportajı (in Turkish). Onur Yayınları.
- Wilmshurst, David (2000). The Ecclesiastical Organisation of the Church of the East, 1318–1913 (PDF). Peeters Publishers.
