= Bozyamaç, Şemdinli =

Village in Hakkari Province, Turkey

Bozyamaç
- Village
- Location within Turkey
- Coordinates: 37.371°N 44.439°E
- Country: Turkey
- Province: Hakkâri
- District: Şemdinli
- Population (2023): 287
- Time zone: UTC+3 (TRT)

Bozyamaç (Kurdish: Bêmbo) is a village in the Şemdinli District in Hakkâri Province in Turkey. The village is populated by Kurds of the Humaru and Xanî tribes and had a population of 287 in 2023.

Bozyamaç has three hamlets attached to it: Meydan, Deravi (Derawê) and Öncü (Reşîdan). Only Deravi is populated.

== Population ==
Population history from 1997 to 2023:

Population
Year	Pop.	±%
1997	477	—
2007	418	−12.4%
2010	422	+1.0%
2015	327	−22.5%
2020	307	−6.1%
2023	287	−6.5%
