= Malik Qambar =

Catholic-Assyrian national leader

Malik Qambar d'Malik Warda ܡܐܠܝܟ ܩܐܡܒܐܪ ܕ'ܡܐܠܝܟ ܘܐܪܕܐ
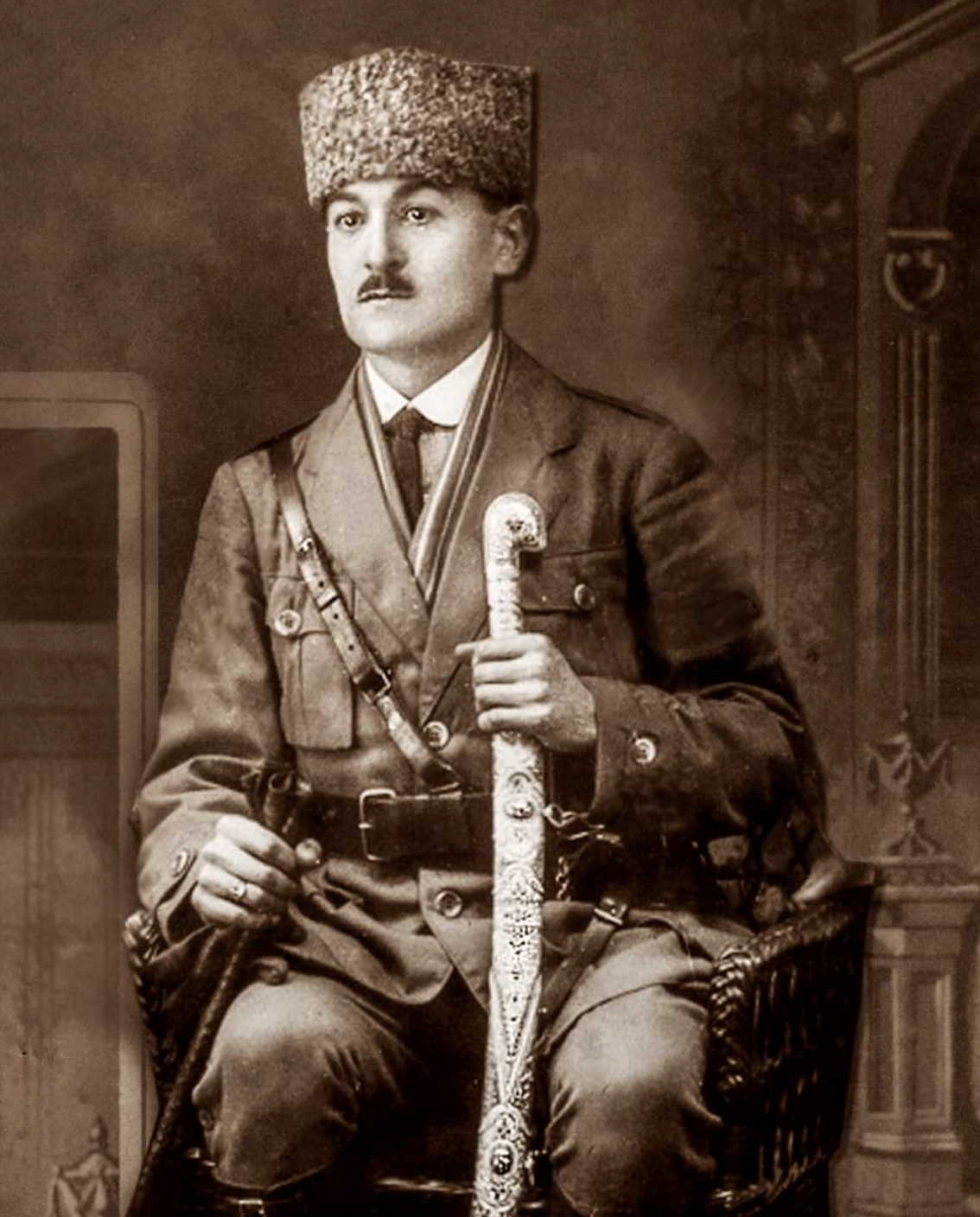
- Born: 15 May 1888; Jilu, Hakkari, Ottoman Empire
- Died: 17 February 1969 (aged 80); Beirut, Lebanon
- Spouse: Shushan Mar Shimun
- Relatives: Malik Warda I (Grandfather); Malik Warda II (Father); Nimrod Mar Shimun (Father-in-law)
- Military career
- Allegiance: Jilu tribe Chaldo-Assyrian Battalion (1919-1923); Ethiopian Empire (1934-1936)
- Service years: 1919-1923 1934-1936
- Conflicts: World War I Second Italo-Ethiopian War

Malik Qambar or Kambar (Syriac: ܡܐܠܝܟ ܩܐܡܒܐܪ) was a Catholic-Assyrian national leader and general of the Assyro-Chaldean battalion formed in 1920 as part of the French Foreign Legion.

== Early life and Background ==
Early in his childhood he learned to handle weapons and gained a reputation in nearby villages for being a good shooter. At the age of 21, Qambar married Lady Shushan from the village of Qudshanis. She was the daughter of Nimrod Shimun, cousin of Patriarch Mar Benyamin Shimun. Malik Qambar was a descendant of former chiefs of the Assyrian Jilu tribe and he would justify his title as well as his immediate predecessors.

In 1769, Malik Warda I who was highly respected among other leaders and tribes, waged an energetic struggle against the Kurds around the Jilo tribe. It is told of an occasion when his men had gone off with horses and mules to Van to buy provisions. The Kurdish tribal leader Nuri Bey had heard about this information and when the men were on their way home from Van, they were attacked by his followers. They lost their provisions and four of their men were killed and seven wounded. When Malik Warda heard about what had happened, he wanted revenge on his men. A year later, in 1770, he marched with 1,700 men and attacked the villages of Nuri Bey. He killed 13 of Nuri Bey's men and wounded 21. After this, Malik Warda's reputation was strengthened among both Assyrians and Kurds. Malik Qambar's father, Malik Warda II, also came to play a major role for the Assyrian population as patron and chief. He defended his tribe against attacks by the Kurds and successfully avenged the attacks they suffered from various Kurdish tribes in the early 20th century.

== Military and Political Career ==
=== World War I ===
Malik Qambar's father in law Nimrod Shimun was assassinated along with several members of his family. Nimrod's supporters accused Patriarch Mar Benyamin Shimun of being behind the order for the assassination, which was carried out by a clan loyal to the patriarch. According to Sam Parhad's biography of Malik Qambar, the British military was behind Nimrod's death as Nimrod wanted the Assyrians to remain neutral during World War I and not take a stand against the Ottomans who ruled the area. According to Parhad, the British who tried to lure the Assyrians over to the Allies saw this as an obstacle and persuaded the patriarch and his sister Lady Surma to eliminate the leader Nimrod Shimun. The patriarch's family was shocked by the news of Nimrod's death and tried to convince those around him that they had nothing to do with Shimun's death.

In 1915 Malik Qambar crossed into Russia with his wife.

Qambar and his family then set out for the Caucasus in 1918 with a company of about 70 people. During their journey, they encountered Kurdish and Turkish tribes and fighting broke out for several hours. Finally, after an arduous and tiring journey, the Assyrians managed to reach the Georgian capital Tbilisi. Here, Qambar was appointed as the representative of the more than 7,000 Assyrians who were present. He managed to negotiate with the Tbilisi authorities to provide the Assyrian refugees with money to buy supplies.

In Georgia, Malik Qambar met another prominent Assyrian, Dr. Freydun Atturaya. Together they came up with an idea which they presented to the Russian authorities based in Tbilisi. The idea was that the Russian army would provide Volunteer Assyrians with equipment and training so that they could help their countrymen in Urmia. The Russian army trained an Assyrian force of 500 men who later went to Urmia to fight. Eventually, Malik Qambar and other Assyrians learned of the cold-blooded assassination of the Assyrian patriarch by Simko, the Kurdish leader. Finally, they also heard how the entire Assyrian population fled from Urmia and Qambar and his friend Freydun Atturaya called the Assyrian committee to a meeting.

The situation in Georgia worsened with the rapidly growing number of Assyrian refugees, and in 1918 the Turks marched with the Germans towards Tbilisi. The Assyrians had to leave the city in a hurry on foot and by horse. On the way, some of them managed to hitchhike by train. The fleeing Assyrians arrived in southern Russia, where an aid committee for the Assyrians was established.

Qambar was appointed head of the committee. Every day, necessities were distributed in the form of food, hygiene items and medicine. Shortly afterwards, Qambar left on the orders of the French to Beirut and was able to rest briefly in Constantinople before arriving at the final destination. In Beirut, he was appointed a lieutenant in the French army with the task of establishing an Assyrian army.

=== Administrator of Syria ===
Qambar had been invited to a dinner in Lebanon with France's commander in Syria and Cilicia General Gouraud, Father Mansour Koryakos representing the Chaldean patriarch and a French colonel. They said that France had planned for the western parts of Mesopotamia, Gozarto in Syria, to go to the Assyrians under French protection.

Malik Qambar was chosen as the leader of this project and he was given the task of returning to the Caucasus to convince as many men as possible to establish a division of warring Assyrians in Upper Gozarto. He was also promised that Assyrians from different parts of the world who were willing to fight could go to Gozarto with French funding. After a few close trips, Qambar returned to Tbilisi.

Together with Dr. Viktor Yonan, editor of the journal L'action Assyro-Chaldéenne, they recruited volunteer Assyrians who later was sent to Syria to fight. Qambar also recruited Assyrians elsewhere, including in Armenia. He also sent letters several times to Assyrians in Iraq. He urged them to join their countrymen in the fight for an Assyria in the Syrian region, but to no avail. According to Malik Qambar's messenger, the British in Iraq had spread rumors that he had sold the Assyrians and Chaldeans to the French.

Finally, Malik Qambar joined the Assyro-Chaldean battalion in Deir ez-Zor. The same battalion that he himself, together with Dr. Yonan, recruited. Malik Qambar organized his troops in Syria with the help of the French officers Captain Hariot and Lieutenants Marandin and Philippot. Assyrian volunteers from various communities and regions, such as Urmia, Jilu, and other Hakkari tribes, gathered for this force. Western Assyrians, fleeing towns and villages in Tur Abdin and the Mardin district, had also joined this force.

In Syria, Qambar and his men fought bravely and in 1922 he left the country to travel to Beirut. On 24 April 1922 France was given the mandate in Syria and Lebanon, while Iraq, Palestine and Trans-Jordan were given the United Kingdom (the French mandate in Syria came as early as the conference in San Remo in April 1920. France forcibly removed Prince Faisal from Damascus and seceded. Lebanon from Syria. It is possible that the French mandate was ratified by the NF in 1922, but in practice it was two years earlier). The Assyro-Chaldean battalion no longer served any function and was soon disbanded. In the future, it became part of the French Foreign Legion. After being in Beirut, Qambar traveled to Marseille, France. In Marseille, he helped more than 300 Assyrian families find jobs and housing.

Together with Agha Petros, he had presented the sufferings of the Assyrians during the First World War and presented their demands for their own autonomy. After his time in Geneva, Qambar returned to France where he wrote newspaper articles describing the fate of the Assyrians. After the disappointment in Geneva, Qambar saw no point in staying in Europe and decided to travel to Lebanon. He arrived in Beirut in 1928 and it was here that he published the newspaper Khuyada Umtanaya (National Unity). He left Beirut and traveled to Jerusalem in 1933. During his time in Jerusalem, Qambar wrote a small booklet about the tours on the Assyrian issue in the League of Nations. He wrote it in English and French.

=== Second Italo-Ethiopian War ===
At the request of Haile Selassie, Malik Qambar later joined the Ethiopian army. He became one of their most prominent captains in the army and won several battles against Mussolini's army, which had invaded Abyssinia. In gratitude for his efforts, the Ethiopian emperor offered him a personal sword engraved with the country's seal and badges. He was the rank of General.

== Later life ==
Qambar then moved on to Cairo, where he lived from 1937 to 1944. When World War II ended, he returned to his family in Beirut in 1945. Malik Qambar continued to be active and traveled to meet Assyrians in Iraq, Syria and the United States. He spent his last years in Beirut writing his memoirs. He died on 17 February 1969 in his home in Beirut.

== Books ==
Sam Parhad 1986 Beyond the Call of Duty.
