= Derecik, Hakkâri =

Town in Hakkâri Province, Turkey

Derecik
- Municipality
- Location in Turkey
- Coordinates: 37.083°N 44.311°E
- Country: Turkey
- Province: Hakkâri
- District: Derecik

Government
  - Mayor: Hasan Dinç (Independent)
- Population (2023): 13,220
- Time zone: UTC+3 (TRT)

Derecik (Kurdish: Rûbarok) is a municipality (belde) and the seat of Derecik District in Hakkâri Province of Turkey. It is populated by Kurds of the Gerdî tribe and had a population of 13,220 in 2023.

The municipality was depopulated in the 1990s during the Kurdish–Turkish conflict.

== Neighborhoods ==
Derecik municipality is divided into the nine quarters of Merkez, Balkaya, Güney, Hacıbey, Orta, Üçyan, Gürmeşe, Rize and Vapurtepe.

== Population ==
Population history of the municipality from 1997 to 2022:

Population
Year	Pop.	±%
1997	5,473	—
2007	8,661	+58.2%
2012	8,913	+2.9%
2017	9,288	+4.2%
2022	11,264	+21.3%
2023	13,220	+17.4%

== Politics ==
AKP candidate Ekrem Çetinkaya won the mayorship in the 2019 local elections with 57.52% of the vote.
