= Alan, Şemdinli =

Village in Hakkari Province, Turkey

Alan
- Village
- Location within Turkey
- Coordinates: 37.301°N 44.755°E
- Country: Turkey
- Province: Hakkâri
- District: Şemdinli
- Population (2023): 432
- Time zone: UTC+3 (TRT)

Alan (Kurdish: Helane; Syriac: Hālānā) is a village in the Şemdinli District of Hakkâri Province in southeastern Turkey. The population of the village was 432 in 2023. It is populated by the Kurdish Zerzan tribe who have close links to their counterparts in Iran.

The hamlet of Cevizpınar (Kanîgûz) is attached to the village.

== History ==
Hālānā (today called Alan) was inhabited by 100 Church of the East Christian families in 1877 when visited by Edward Lewes Cutts and was served by two functioning churches as part of the archdiocese of Shemsdin. It was destroyed by the Ottoman Army in 1915 amidst the Sayfo.

== Geography ==
The Fritillaria imperialis plant grows in the village.

== Population ==
Population history from 2007 to 2023:

Population
Year	Pop.	±%
2007	288	—
2010	272	−5.6%
2015	463	+70.2%
2020	518	+11.9%
2023	432	−16.6%

== Bibliography ==
- Andrews, Peter Alford; Benninghaus, Rüdiger (1989). Ethnic Groups in the Republic of Turkey. Reichert.
- Wilmshurst, David (2000). The Ecclesiastical Organisation of the Church of the East, 1318–1913 (PDF). Peeters Publishers.
- Yacoub, Joseph (2016). Year of the Sword: The Assyrian Christian Genocide, A History. Translated by James Ferguson. Oxford University Press.
