= Kayalar, Şemdinli =

Village in Hakkari Province, Turkey

Kayalar
- Village
- Location within Turkey
- Coordinates: 37.332°N 44.684°E
- Country: Turkey
- Province: Hakkâri
- District: Şemdinli
- Population (2023): 1,949
- Time zone: UTC+3 (TRT)

Kayalar (Kurdish: Katûne) is a village in the Şemdinli District in Hakkâri Province in Turkey. The village is populated by Kurds of the Zerzan tribe and had a population of 1,949 in 2023.

Kayalar has seven hamlets attached to it: Erikli (Ballê), Husrova (Xisrova), Mağaraönü (Şkeftan), Sarıca (Zerîk), Seçkin (Zêvkan), Kule and Yukarıkayalar (Katûna jori).

== Population ==
Population history from 1997 to 2023:

Population
Year	Pop.	±%
1997	1,327	—
2007	1,677	+26.4%
2010	1,846	+10.1%
2015	2,047	+10.9%
2020	2,011	−1.8%
2023	1,949	−3.1%
