= Battle of Oramar =

1917 battle in Turkey

Battle of Oramar (1917)
- Part of Persian campaign (World War I)
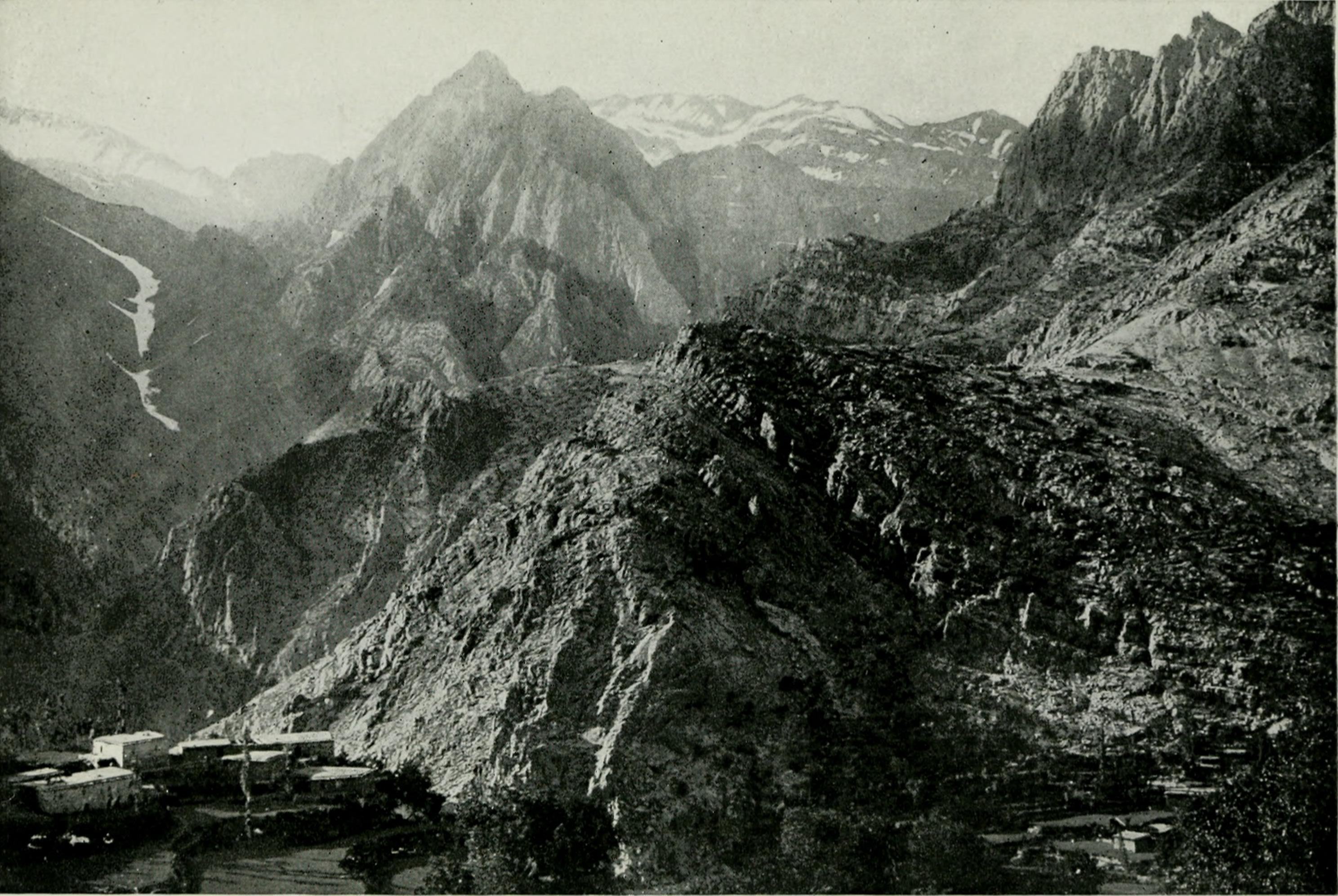
- An old Image of Oramar in the year 1922
Date	September, 1917
Location	Oramar, Ottoman Empire
Result	Assyrian victory: Soto Agha flees to Nervi

Belligerents
Assyrian volunteers Russian Cossacks	Oramar tribe

Commanders and leaders
Agha Petros; Dawid Mar Shimun; Shimun XIX Benyamin	Suto Agha

Strength
Unknown	Unknown

Casualties and losses
1 dead 2 wounded	16+ killed 30 captured

The Battle of Oramar or Oramar Expedition, was a battle in the present-day village of Dağlıca, Yüksekova, in Hakkari, that took place in September 1917 between the Assyrian volunteers of Agha Petros, supported by Russian Cossacks, against the Kurds of Suto Agha. The Assyrian forces initiated the attack with the goal of recapturing Oramar that was held by the Kurds since 1914, in order to punish Soto Agha for his previous crimes against the Assyrians during Sayfo.

== Background ==
Soto Agha was a fierce enemy of the mountain Assyrians. He sacks their villages, steals their flocks, he abducts their women and murders the male villagers. However, the Russian Cossacks were completely unaware of these actions committed by Soto. Completely blinded by his oriental hospitality, the Russians accepted his guides to lead them through the mountains. When the Russian Cossacks arrived at a deep gorge, they were ambushed. Soto's men attacked from all sides, slaughtering every Cossack until the very last man was killed. The 18 Cossacks who decided to stay behind at the home of Soto, were also massacred. This left the Assyrians of Hakkari on their own.

Before the Battle of Oramar in 1917, Soto had been captured as a thief and looter. Agha Petros, unaware of who the thief was, ordered his men to bring him in. Petros rose to his feet, and went up to the prisoner: "Sooto of Oramar" Petros said, "I will spare your life as you spared mine twenty four years ago. I am Petros of Baz". Agha petros gave Soto a sword in gratitude, and Soto gave Petros a knife.

== Battle ==
It was in early September that the Assyrian spiritual leader Mar Shimun had ordered for the punishment of Soto Agha, due to the atrocities committed against the Assyrian village of Gawar. The Russians became so skeptical of any success in attacking Soto Agha because of his strong defense, that they urged a retreat. After a fierce confrontation, the guards of Soto Agha fled because of the strong Assyrian offensive.

While the men of patriarch Mar Shimun were busy fighting elsewhere, Agha petros and his army had already started to advanced into Oramar. When the Russians saw the battlefield, they immediately urged another retreat. Agha petros, refusing to withdraw, captured Oramar by nightfall when an additional force of the patriarch arrived. When the patriarch's force arrived to Oramar, they witnessed the smoke of the battlefield just rising up to the heavens. This battle later became known in Assyrian history as "The Assyrian Battle in the clouds".

== Aftermath ==
Oramar was besieged by an army led by Agha Petros while an army led by Dawid Mar Shimun attacked from another direction, killing 16 and capturing 30 Kurds, and suffered one death and two wounded. The village had fallen to the Assyrian forces by the time an additional force led by the patriarch arrived, but Soto and a number of Kurds fled to Nervi. Assyrian women who had been held captive by Soto were released from his harem, and Assyrian forces under the patriarch's command pursued Suto westward while Agha Petros marched east. Suto's eldest son was killed outside the church (Mar Saba) in Jilu by Sawa Matloub d'Jilu

The Russian forces, previously doubtful of any chance of victory, were stunned by how the Assyrians managed to capture Oramar and defeat Soto Agha. Oramar was sacked and looted, and the horses were fed with grapes while the donkeys were fed with millet.

== See also ==
- Shimun XIX Benyamin
- Agha Petros
- Hakkari Expedition 1916
- Cossacks
