= Dağlıca, Yüksekova =

Village in Hakkari Province, Turkey

Dağlıca
- Village
- Location within Turkey
- Coordinates: 37.373°N 44.085°E
- Country: Turkey
- Province: Hakkâri
- District: Yüksekova
- Population (2023): 570
- Time zone: UTC+3 (TRT)

Dağlıca (Kurdish: Oremar; Syriac: Oramar) is a village in Yüksekova District of Hakkâri Province in southeastern Turkey. It is located by the river Oramar (Turkish: Rubarişin Çayı), a tributary of the Great Zab. The village is populated by Kurds of the Oramar tribe and had a population of 570 in 2023.

Dağlıca has the hamlets of Akar, Avasan, Beğendik, Bozkaya (Awitxêr), Demirli, Genişdere (Çeman), Gökağaç, İncirlik (Firavînk), Köyiçi, Ortaklar (Çemparîzan), Sivrice and Üçkardeş (Zîrî) attached to the village. The unpopulated village of İkiyaka (Sat) and its likewise unpopulated four hamlets of Berkevi (Berkevî), Molya Yasin (Molya Yasîn), Rezuk and Gundi juri (Gundê jorî) are situated southeast of Dağlıca.

Oramar is situated in a mountainous and rugged landscape, with Mount Sat and the Rêjgar highlands to its east, and Mount Certe to the west.

== Etymology ==
The origin of the name Oramar is uncertain but likely ancient and there are similar place-names in the region, such as the slope Ora Bis̲h̲u, the village of Oris̲h̲u and the city Urmiya. One local interpretation derives the name from the Kurdish words erd (land) and demar (vein), referring to its mountainous landscape.

== History ==
Oramar (today called Dağlıca) was historically inhabited by Church of the East Christians, who were rayets (vassals) of the ashiret (free men) Jilu tribe. According to local tradition, Mar Mamo fled persecution and became a hermit at Oramar. Mamo collected all snakes in the region and placed them in a pit, upon which he constructed a sanctuary, and it was believed it could heal snake and dog bites, as well as scorpion stings. The Church of Mar Mamo at Oramar was constructed in the 4th century. It has been suggested that it was built on the site of a pre-Christian shrine.

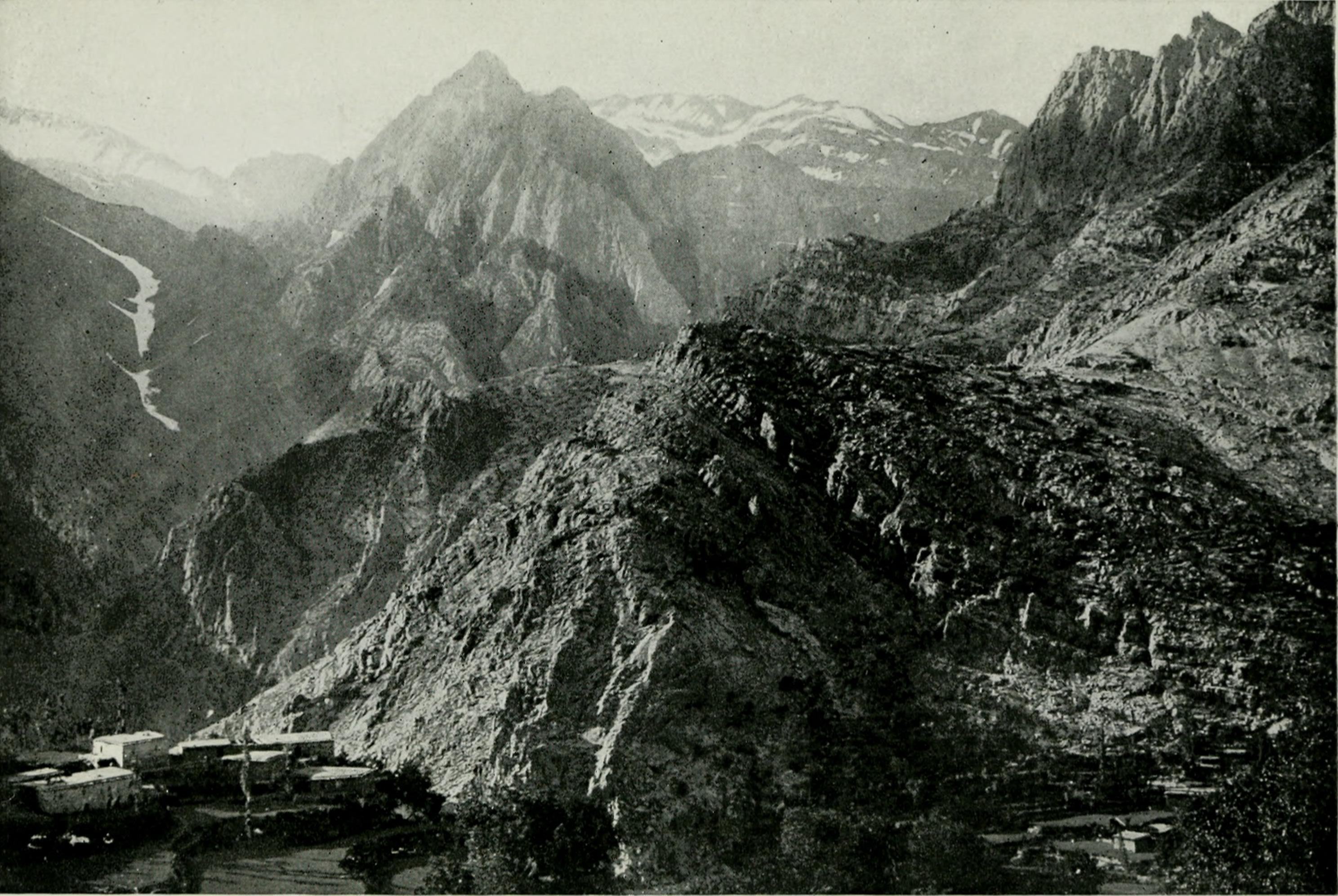
Oramar, 1922.

The priest Paul of Oramar copied a manuscript at the village of Nāzi in the Anzel district in 1563. There was also a church of Mār Imāmā and Mār Daniel in the village. Most of the Christian population in the village was forcibly supplanted by Kurds, and the Church of Mar Daniel was converted into a mosque at the end of the 19th century. Oramar was the seat of a kaza in the sanjak of Hakkari in the vilayet of Van, which was inhabited by 14,000 Kurds, 11,040 Church of the East Christians, and 870 Turks in 1900, for a total of 25,910 people. At that time, 400 people inhabited the village, including 40 Church of the East Christians who were served by the diocese of Jilu.

By the time of the Sayfo during the First World War, the village was controlled by Suto, agha (chief) of the Kurdish Oramar tribe, who actively participated in the mass slaughter of Christians in the region, and used Oramar as his headquarters. However, he spared the Christians in the village as they were responsible for the maintenance of the church of Mar Mamo, which was considered sacred by the Kurds also, and it was feared the snakes would return if the priests or the church were harmed.

The Christians retaliated against Suto and, in early September 1917, he was besieged at Oramar by the army of Agha Petros whilst an army led by the brother of the Patriarch of the Church of the East Shimun XIX Benyamin attacked from another direction, killing sixteen Kurds and capturing thirty, only suffering one death and two wounded. The village had fallen to the Christian forces by the time an additional force led by the patriarch arrived, but Suto and a number of Kurds had already fled to Nervi. Christian women who had been held captive by Suto were released from his harem, and Christian forces under the patriarch's command pursued Suto westward as Agha Petros marched east.

After the formation of Turkey in 1923, the new state only had a weak presence in the area. In 1926, Abdullah, the son of Abdulkadir Ubeydullah, after learning about the execution of his father and Sheikh Said, led a short-lived local revolt in Hakkâri. He occupied the army post in Oramar, killing a few soldiers and taking others prisoner. When the Ararat rebellion broke out in 1930, Barzani and Gerdî tribesmen led by Ahmed Barzani attacked Turkish soldiers in Oramar with the help of some locals aiming to distract the Turks from Ararat. The locals Oramar were divided during the conflict and some supported the Turks. The rebellion was suppressed by August 1930 and Turkey consolidated its power in the area.

== Population ==
Population history from 1955 to 2023:

Population
Year	Pop.	±%
1955	943	—
1997	1,227	+30.1%
2007	632	−48.5%
2012	1,471	+132.8%
2017	1,161	−21.1%
2022	628	−45.9%
2023	570	−9.2%

== Bibliography ==
- Andrews, Peter Alfred; Benninghaus, Rüdiger (1989). Ethnic Groups in the Republic of Turkey. Reichert.
- Dickson, Bertram (1910). "Journeys in Kurdistan". The Geographical Journal. 35 (4). Royal Geographical Society: 357–378. doi:10.2307/1777016. JSTOR 1777016.
- Hakobyan, Tʻadevos Khachʻaturi; Melik-Bakhshyan, Stepʻan Tigrani; Barseghyan, Hovhannes Khachʻaturi (2001). Հայաստանի եւ հարակից շրջանների տեղանունների բառարան (in Armenian). Vol. 5. Yerevan University Press.
- Kızılkaya, Abdulkadir (2024). Suhbeta Sed Eşîran (in Kurdish). Nûbihar.
- Nikitin, Basil (2012). "Orāmār". Encyclopaedia of Islam.
- Werda, Joel E. (1924). The Flickering Light of Asia or The Assyrian Nation and Church (PDF).
- Wigram, Edgar T. A. (1916). "The Ashirét Highlands of Hakkiari (Mesopotamia)". Journal of the Royal Central Asian Society. 3 (2–3): 40–59. doi:10.1080/03068371608724740.
- Wilmshurst, David (2000). The Ecclesiastical Organisation of the Church of the East, 1318–1913 (PDF). Peeters Publishers.
- Yacoub, Joseph (2016). Year of the Sword: The Assyrian Christian Genocide, A History. Translated by James Ferguson. Oxford University Press.
- Yalçın-Heckmann, Lale (1991). Tribe and Kinship among the Kurds. University of Michigan.
