= Yufkalı, Şemdinli =

Village in Hakkari Province, Turkey

Yufkalı
- Village
- Location within Turkey
- Coordinates: 37.409°N 44.526°E
- Country: Turkey
- Province: Hakkâri
- District: Şemdinli
- Population (2023): 651
- Time zone: UTC+3 (TRT)

Yufkalı (Kurdish: Nerdoşe, Syriac: Nairdūshā) is a village in the Şemdinli District in Hakkâri Province in Turkey. The village is populated by Kurds of the Humaru tribe and had a population of 651 in 2023.

Yufkalı has the five hamlets of Binahare (Bîyaholê), Elmalı (Sêvê), Kola, Tuğlu (Tûyê) and Aşağıtuğlu (Tûyê jêrî) attached to it.

== History ==
The village was populated by 20 Assyrian families in 1877.

== Population ==
Population history of the village from 2015 to 2023:

Population
Year	Pop.	±%
2015	685	—
2018	674	−1.6%
2021	702	+4.2%
2023	651	−7.3%
