= Tekeli, Şemdinli =

Village in Hakkari Province, Turkey

Tekeli
- Village
- Location within Turkey
- Coordinates: 37.240°N 44.659°E
- Country: Turkey
- Province: Hakkâri
- District: Şemdinli
- Population (2023): 2,268
- Time zone: UTC+3 (TRT)

Tekeli (Kurdish: Gare) is a village in the Şemdinli District in Hakkâri Province in Turkey. The village is populated by Kurds of the Zerzan tribe and had a population of 2,268 in 2023.

Tekeli has the four hamlets of Balıklı (Masîro), Oğlaklı (Meleyan), Tanyolu (Gelêşim) and Üstünağaç (Şawûtê) attached to it.

== Population ==
Population history of the village from 2013 to 2023:

Population
Year	Pop.	±%
2013	2,145	—
2015	2,432	+13.4%
2020	2,435	+0.1%
2023	2,268	−6.9%
