= Ayranlı, Şemdinli =

Village in Hakkari Province, Turkey

Ayranlı
- Village
- Location within Turkey
- Coordinates: 37.271°N 44.239°E
- Country: Turkey
- Province: Hakkâri
- District: Şemdinli
- Population (1997): 0
- Time zone: UTC+3 (TRT)

Ayranlı (Kurdish: Bêdaw) is a depopulated village in the Şemdinli District in Hakkâri Province in Turkey, on the border with Iraq. The village was previously populated by Kurds of the Herkî tribe. The hamlet of Üzümkıran (Dêhî) is attached to the village.

== History ==
The village had a population of 794 in 1967 but was evacuated and burned in 1993 by the state, during the Kurdish–Turkish conflict. At the 1997 census, it had no population. Destroyed homes were remade into five police stations and, as of 2022, the local population were still prevented from returning to the village.
