= Tütünlü, Şemdinli =

Village in Hakkari Province, Turkey

Tütünlü
- Village
- Location within Turkey
- Coordinates: 37.216°N 44.508°E
- Country: Turkey
- Province: Hakkâri
- District: Şemdinli
- Population (2023): 2,137
- Time zone: UTC+3 (TRT)

Tütünlü (Kurdish: Evliyan) is a village in the Şemdinli District in Hakkâri Province in Turkey. The village is populated by Kurds of the Humaru tribe and had a population of 2,137 in 2023. Tütünlü has the Güleç (Rûyan) hamlet attached to it.

It is a tobacco-producing village.

== Population ==
Population history from 1997 to 2023:

Population
Year	Pop.	±%
1997	952	—
2007	1,464	+53.8%
2010	1,702	+16.3%
2015	1,911	+12.3%
2020	2,138	+11.9%
2023	2,137	−0.0%
