= Korgan, Şemdinli =

Village in Hakkari Province, Turkey

Korgan
- Village
- Location within Turkey
- Coordinates: 37.401°N 44.498°E
- Country: Turkey
- Province: Hakkâri
- District: Şemdinli
- Population (2023): 4,190
- Time zone: UTC+3 (TRT)

Korgan (Kurdish: Gulank) is a village in the Şemdinli District in Hakkâri Province in Turkey. The village is populated by Kurds of the Humaru tribe and had a population of 4,190 in 2023.

The hamlet of Güzelkonak (Haruna) is attached to the village.

== Population ==
Population history from 1997 to 2023:

Population
Year	Pop.	±%
1997	3,079	—
2007	4,389	+42.5%
2010	4,694	+6.9%
2015	4,396	−6.3%
2020	4,346	−1.1%
2023	4,190	−3.6%
