= Derecik District =

District in Hakkâri Province, Turkey

- District
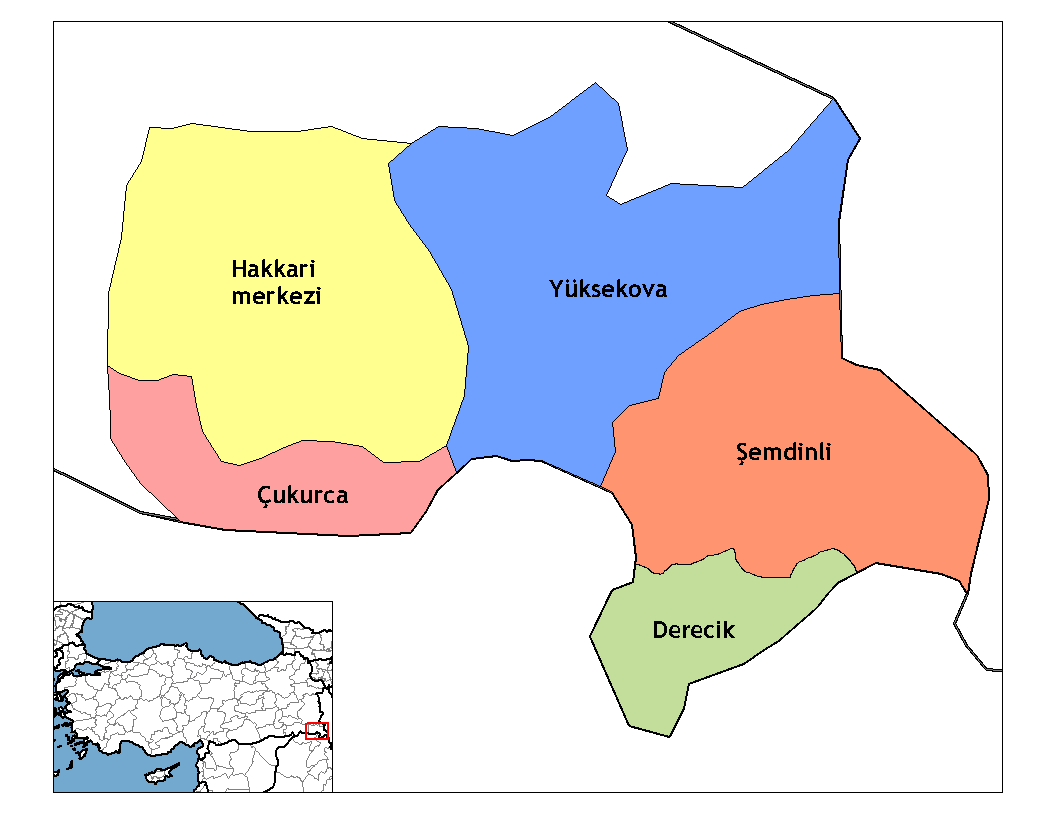
- Map showing Derecik District in Hakkâri Province
- Country: Turkey
- Province: Hakkâri
- Seat: Derecik

Government
  - Kaymakam: Abdulkadir Işık
- Area: 435 km^{2} (168 sq mi)
- Population (2023): 25,907
  - Density: 59.6/km^{2} (154/sq mi)
- Time zone: UTC+3 (TRT)
- Website: www.derecik.gov.tr

Derecik District is a district in Hakkâri Province in Turkey. The district was created from Şemdinli in 2018 and has four villages. The district had a population of 25,907 in 2023. Its area is 435 km^{2}.

The district is populated by Kurds of the Gerdî tribe with the Begzade tribe present in one village.

It borders the Erbil Governorate of Kurdistan Region in Iraq to the south and the local Gerdî tribe shares closer traditions and customs with the Gerdî Kurds residing on the Iraqi side than the Kurds of Yüksekova and Hakkâri.

== Settlements ==
The main town of the district is Derecik (Rûbarok).

The four villages of the district:

1. Anadağ (Bêruh)
2. Gelişen (Gerdî Şapatan)
3. Ortaklar (Bêsusin)
4. Ulaşan (Zerin)
5. Uslu (Hordin)

The sixteen hamlets of the district:

1. Adıgüzel
2. Akören (Bêşan)
3. Aralık (Parewê)
4. Bağlıca (Mamreşan)
5. Beğendik
6. Beşikağaç (Nihave)
7. Bölek (Serekanî)
8. Gökçetaş (Musekan)
9. Karakoç (Sunê)
10. Koryürek (Bêgijnê)
11. Kütüklu (Zewyarezi)
12. Mordağ (Dêrkê)
13. Ormancık (Bêgalte)
14. Örencık (Benavok)
15. Suçıktı (Bêlutyan)
16. Taşlıçay (Çemena geli)
17. Toklu
18. Yeşilova (Îsyan)

== Population ==
Population history of the district from 2018 to 2023:

Population
Year	Pop.	±%
2018	22,953	—
2019	23,377	+1.8%
2020	22,988	−1.7%
2021	23,140	+0.7%
2022	23,461	+1.4%
2023	25,907	+10.4%
