= Çatalca, Şemdinli =

Village in Hakkari Province, Turkey

Çatalca
- Village
- Location within Turkey
- Coordinates: 37.393°N 44.576°E
- Country: Turkey
- Province: Hakkâri
- District: Şemdinli
- Population (2023): 952
- Time zone: UTC+3 (TRT)

Çatalca (Kurdish: Dêman) is a village in the Şemdinli District in Hakkâri Province in Turkey. The village is populated by Kurds of the Humaru tribe and had a population of 952 in 2023.

Çatalca has the five hamlets of Erdemli (Meleyan), Güvenli (Helank), Mirava (Mîrava), Niksa and Soğuksu (Tîsî) attached to it. Mirava and Niksa are unpopulated.

== Population ==
Population history from 1997 to 2023:

Population
Year	Pop.	±%
1997	581	—
2007	1,032	+77.6%
2010	1,131	+9.6%
2015	1,076	−4.9%
2020	1,036	−3.7%
2023	952	−8.1%
