= Çalışkanlar, Şemdinli =

Village in Hakkâri Province, Turkey

Çalışkanlar
- Village
- Location within Turkey
- Coordinates: 37.258°N 44.636°E
- Country: Turkey
- Province: Hakkâri
- District: Şemdinli
- Population (2023): 1,368
- Time zone: UTC+3 (TRT)

Çalışkanlar (Kurdish: Kadana, Syriac: Qātūnā,) is a village in the Şemdinli District, Hakkâri Province, Turkey. The village is populated by Kurds of the Zerzan tribe and had a population of 1,368 in 2023.

The hamlets of Kepenek, Koçbaşı (Geyman), Küplüce, Samanlı, Üçgöze, Veliköy and Yeşilöz are attached to the village.

== History ==
The village was populated by 100 Assyrian families in 1877.
