= Sargis Yosip =

Mar Sargis Yousip is the Assyrian Church of the East's bishop-emeritus of Baghdad, Iraq. Born in 1950 in Baghdad, he was consecrated a bishop at the age of 17 by Mar Yosip Khnanisho in 1967, at the Mar Zaia Cathedral in Baghdad. In 2002, Yousip left for the United States and has since been unable to return to his diocese. He currently resides in exile at Modesto, California.

== See also ==
- Assyrian Church of the East
- Assyrian Church of the East's Holy Synod
