= Beyyurdu, Şemdinli =

Village in Hakkari Province, Turkey

Beyyurdu
- Village
- Location within Turkey
- Coordinates: 37.321°N 44.229°E
- Country: Turkey
- Province: Hakkâri
- District: Şemdinli
- Population (2023): 365
- Time zone: UTC+3 (TRT)

Beyyurdu (Kurdish: Bêdevê; Syriac: Beṯ Daiwe) (Note: Formerly known as Bedevi.) is a village in the Şemdinli District in Hakkâri Province in Turkey. The village is populated by Kurds of the Herkî tribe and had a population of 365 in 2023.

The hamlet of Kayacık is attached to the village.

== History ==
Beṯ Daiwe (today called Beyyurdu) was inhabited by 24 Church of the East Christian families in 1877 when visited by Edward Lewes Cutts and was served by one functioning church as part of the archdiocese of Shemsdin. There was a church of Mar Cyriacus and John the Baptist. It was destroyed by the Ottoman Army in 1915 amidst the Sayfo.

The village was evacuated in the 1990s during the Kurdish–Turkish conflict.

== Population ==
Population history from 1997 to 2023:

Population
Year	Pop.	±%
1997	342	—
2007	432	+26.3%
2010	450	+4.2%
2015	452	+0.4%
2020	407	−10.0%
2023	365	−10.3%

== Bibliography ==
- Erdost, Muzaffer İlhan (1993). Şemdinli röportajı (in Turkish). Onur Yayınları. p. 292.
- Wilmshurst, David (2000). The Ecclesiastical Organisation of the Church of the East, 1318–1913 (PDF). Peeters Publishers.
- Yacoub, Joseph (2016). Year of the Sword: The Assyrian Christian Genocide, A History. Translated by James Ferguson. Oxford University Press.
