= Öveç, Şemdinli =

Village in Hakkari Province, Turkey

Öveç
- Village
- Location within Turkey
- Coordinates: 37.370°N 44.477°E
- Country: Turkey
- Province: Hakkâri
- District: Şemdinli
- Population (2023): 486
- Time zone: UTC+3 (TRT)

Öveç (Kurdish: Sûrûnis; Syriac: Sārūnīs) is a village in the Şemdinli District in Hakkâri Province in Turkey. The village is populated by Kurds of the Humaru tribe and had a population of 486 in 2023.

Öveç has the two hamlets of Harmanlı (Dêrebanî) and Karakuş (Derya) attached to it.

== History ==
Sārūnīs (today called Öveç) was populated by 40 Church of the East Christian families in 1877 when visited by Edward Lewes Cutts and was served by one functioning church as part of the archdiocese of Shemsdin.

== Population ==
Population history from 1997 to 2023:

Population
Year	Pop.	±%
1997	503	—
2007	551	+9.5%
2010	591	+7.3%
2015	567	−4.1%
2020	549	−3.2%
2023	486	−11.5%

== Bibliography ==
- Andrews, Peter Alford; Benninghaus, Rüdiger, eds. (1989). Ethnic Groups in the Republic of Turkey.
- Wilmshurst, David (2000). The Ecclesiastical Organisation of the Church of the East, 1318–1913 (PDF). Peeters Publishers.
