= Şemdinli =

Town in Hakkâri Province, Turkey

- Municipality
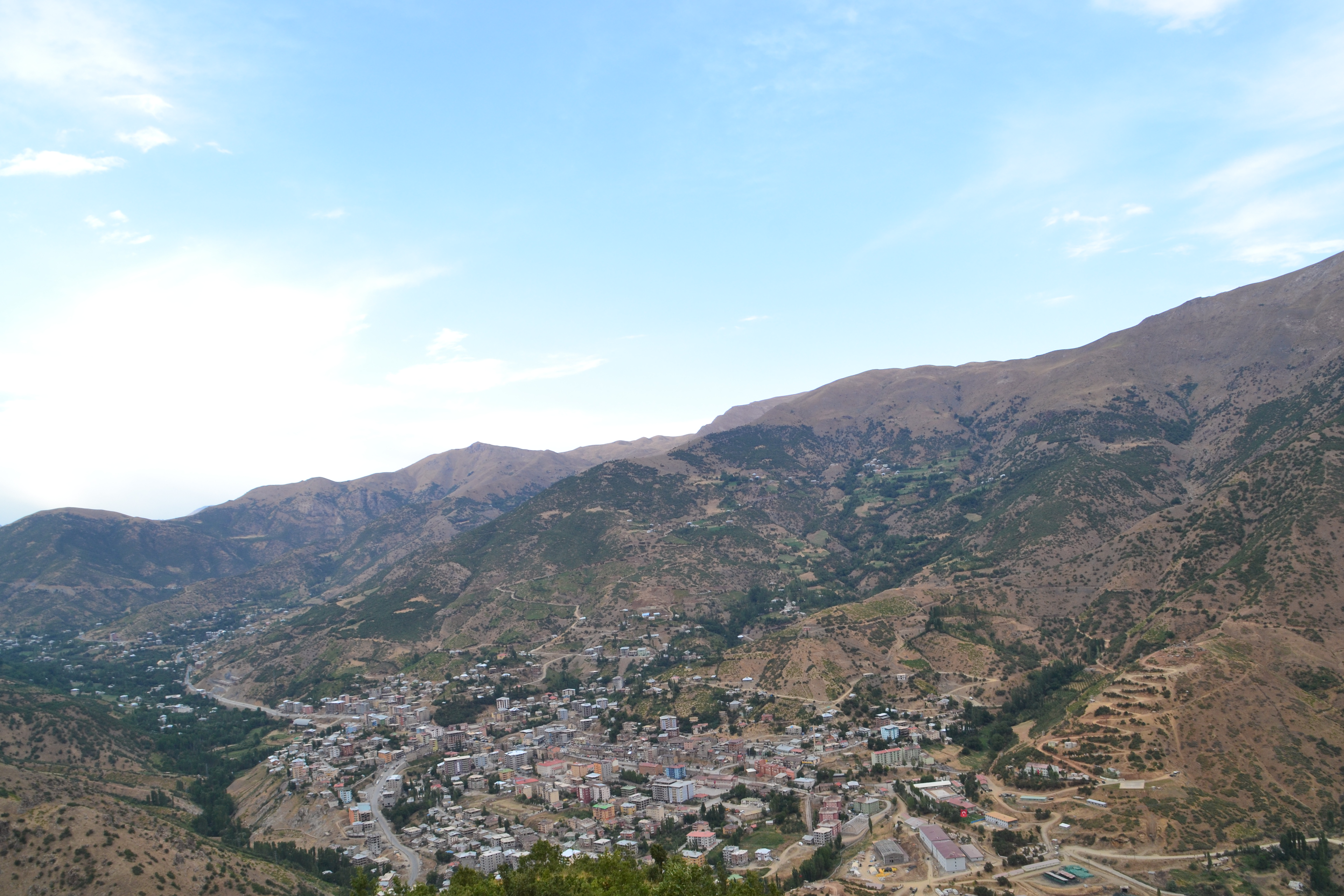
- Image of Şemdinli

- Location within Turkey
- Coordinates: 37.308°N 44.571°E
- Country: Turkey
- Province: Hakkâri
- District: Şemdinli

Government
  - Mayor: Tahir Saklı (AKP)
- Population (2023): 18,220
- Time zone: UTC+3 (TRT)
- Website: www.semdinli.bel.tr

Şemdinli (Kurdish: Şemzînan, Syriac: ܫܲܡܙܕܝܼܢ, romanized: Šamzdīn or Shemsdīn) is a town located in the Şemdinli District of Hakkari Province in Turkey and had a population of 18,220 in 2023. The current mayor is Tahir Saklı from the Justice and Development Party (AKP), elected in 2019.

The town is populated by Kurds of the Humaru and Zerzan Kurdish tribes and moreover of mixed tribal and non-tribal origin.

== Neighborhoods ==
Şemdinli is divided into the five neighborhoods of Beşevler, Karşıyaka, Moda, Yayla and Yeni.

== Kurdish-Turkish conflict ==
=== Conflict between the PKK and the Turkish state forces ===
A bomb exploded in Şemdinli town centre on November 1, 2005. It was officially attributed to the Kurdistan Workers' Party (PKK), an armed Kurdish militant group. On November 9 one man was killed in a grenade attack on a local bookshop. The suspects of this attack, however, were caught in the act by bystanders. They were said to be members of a Turkish Gendarmerie unit, JITEM. The resulting investigation developed into a major political issue in Turkey in the first half of 2006. After a lengthy legal process the three suspects were eventually sentenced to 39 years.

Investigations concerning the Şemdinli bombing trial were blocked by the military, and all the judges and prosecutor associated with the Şemdinli bookshop bombing case transferred from Van to other cities following a June 2007 decree.

=== Clashes in 2012 ===
On 23 July 2012, Turkish security forces began a major security offensive, backed by airpower, against the PKK around Şemdinli. Interior minister, İdris Naim Şahin, explained that the forces were attempting to block the PKK's escape routes into northern Iraq, and that as many as 115 PKK fighters had been killed. Television news channel, Nergis Televizyonu (NTV), claimed that up to two thousand troops were involved in the operation. On 5 August 2012, PKK forces fired on a Turkish military post in the village of Gecimli, triggering clashes that killed 22 fighters, soldiers and village guards, and injuring 15 others, including five civilians. The military post was one of a number attacked in Hakkâri Province, although there were no reports of casualties in the other incidents.

== Population ==
Population history from 1997 to 2023:

Population
| Year | Pop. | ±% |
|---|---|---|
| 1997 | 11,879 | — |
| 2007 | 11,727 | −1.3% |
| 2010 | 11,211 | −4.4% |
| 2015 | 14,854 | +32.5% |
| 2020 | 15,504 | +4.4% |
| 2023 | 18,220 | +17.5% |

== Climate ==
Şemdinli has a hot, dry-summer continental climate (Köppen: Dsa).

Climate data for Şemdinli
| Month | Jan | Feb | Mar | Apr | May | Jun | Jul | Aug | Sep | Oct | Nov | Dec | Year |
|---|---|---|---|---|---|---|---|---|---|---|---|---|---|
| Mean daily maximum °C (°F) | 1.3 (34.3) | 2.9 (37.2) | 7.9 (46.2) | 14.8 (58.6) | 21.4 (70.5) | 27.5 (81.5) | 31.7 (89.1) | 31.9 (89.4) | 27.9 (82.2) | 21.2 (70.2) | 12.6 (54.7) | 3.7 (38.7) | 17.1 (62.7) |
| Daily mean °C (°F) | −2.5 (27.5) | −1.4 (29.5) | 3.4 (38.1) | 9.7 (49.5) | 15.2 (59.4) | 20.8 (69.4) | 24.7 (76.5) | 24.7 (76.5) | 20.4 (68.7) | 14.7 (58.5) | 7.5 (45.5) | 0.1 (32.2) | 11.4 (52.5) |
| Mean daily minimum °C (°F) | −6.2 (20.8) | −5.6 (21.9) | −1.0 (30.2) | 4.6 (40.3) | 9.1 (48.4) | 14.1 (57.4) | 17.7 (63.9) | 17.5 (63.5) | 13.0 (55.4) | 8.2 (46.8) | 2.5 (36.5) | −3.5 (25.7) | 5.9 (42.6) |
| Average precipitation mm (inches) | 71 (2.8) | 81 (3.2) | 93 (3.7) | 101 (4.0) | 55 (2.2) | 11 (0.4) | 3 (0.1) | 2 (0.1) | 4 (0.2) | 27 (1.1) | 61 (2.4) | 64 (2.5) | 573 (22.7) |
Source: Climate-Data.org
