= Şemdinli District =

District in Hakkâri Province, Turkey

- District
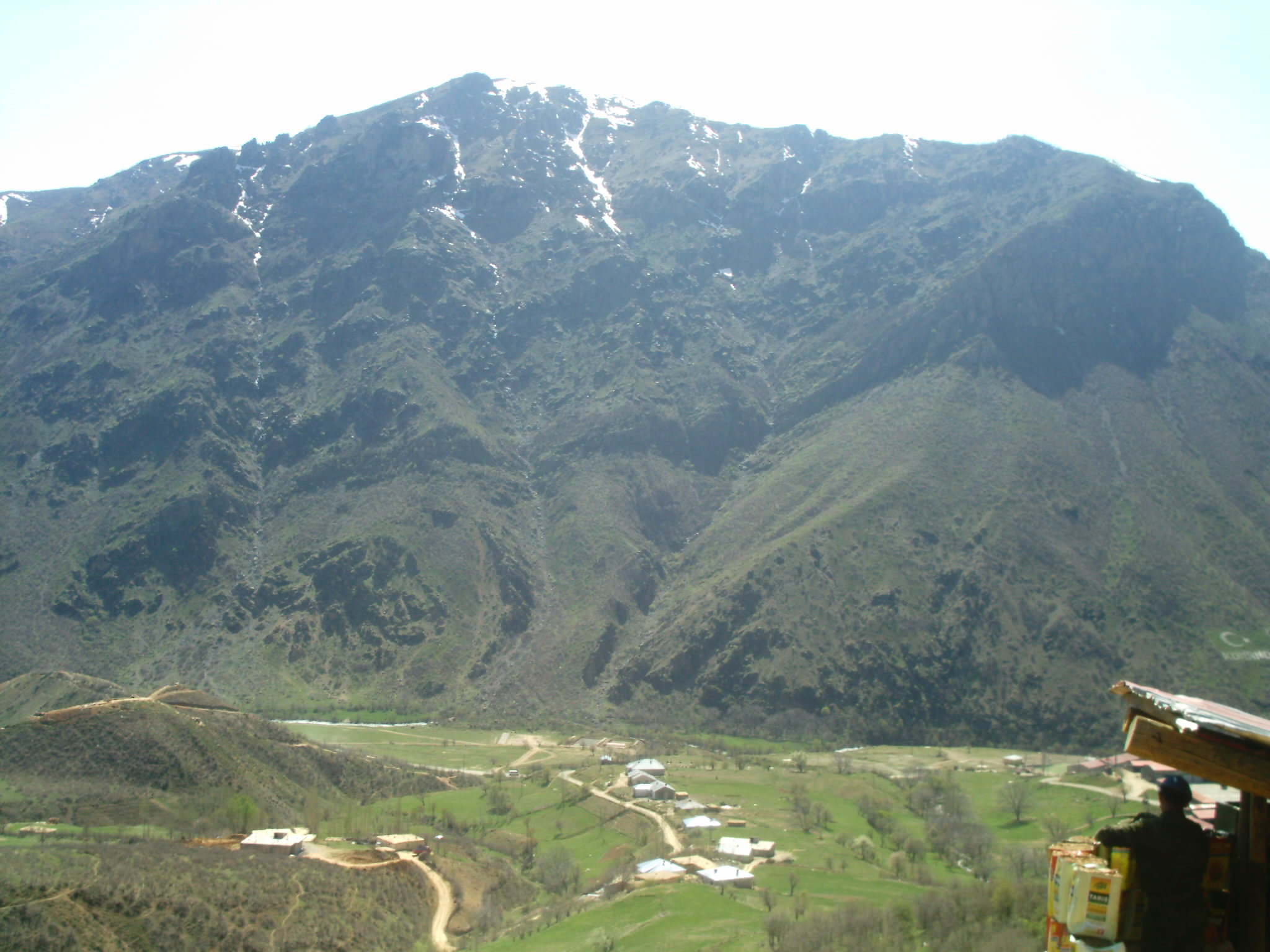
- Mountains in the district

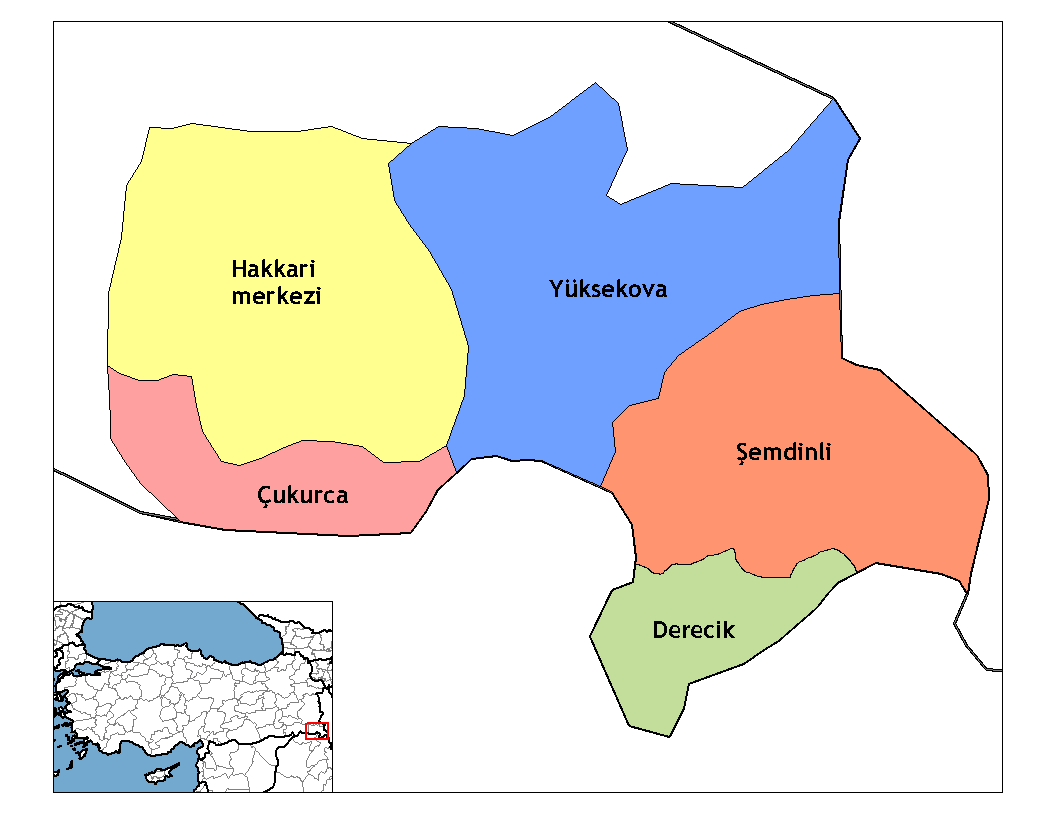
- Map showing Şemdinli District in Hakkâri Province

- Location within Turkey
- Country: Turkey
- Province: Hakkâri
- Seat: Şemdinli

Government
  - Kaymakam: Batuhan Taşgın
- Area: 1,209 km^{2} (467 sq mi)
- Population (2023): 44,742
  - Density: 37.01/km^{2} (95.85/sq mi)
- Time zone: UTC+3 (TRT)
- Website: www.semdinli.gov.tr

Şemdinli District is a district in the Hakkâri Province of Turkey. The district had a population of 44,742 in 2023, with the town of Şemdinli as its seat. Its area is 1,209 km^{2}.

The district was established in 1936. Part of the district was separated to form Derecik District in 2018. The current district governor (kaymakam) is Batuhan Taşgın.

== Settlements ==
There is one municipality in Şemdinli District:

- Şemdinli

The district has twenty-two villages of which three are unpopulated:

1. Alan (Hālānā, Helane)
2. Altınsu (Şepatan)
3. Ayranlı (Bêdaw)
4. Bağlar (Nehrî)
5. Beyyurdu (Bêdevê)
6. Boğazköy (Bêgoza,)
7. Bozyamaç (Bêmbo)
8. Çalışkanlar (Kadana)
9. Çatalca (Dêman)
10. Çevre (Bay)
11. Çubuklu (Bêntûr)
12. Günyazı (Qelaşk)
13. Kayalar (Katûne)
14. Konur (Nixayilan)
15. Korgan (Gulank)
16. Meşelik (Herkî)
17. Öveç (Sûrûnis)
18. Tekeli (Gare)
19. Tütünlü (Evliyan)
20. Uğuraçan (Betkar)
21. Yaylapınar (Salaran)
22. Yufkalı (Nerdoşe)

The district has forty-two hamlets:

1. Aktütün (Bêzelê)
2. Aşağıkayalar
3. Aşağıtuğlu (Tûyê jêrî)
4. Balıklı (Masîro)
5. Binahare (Bîyaholê)
6. Çamlıca (Bêşems)
7. Çiçekli
8. Deravi (Derawê)
9. Dereyanı (Gûlkan)
10. Elmalı (Sêvê)
11. Erik (Ballê)
12. Güleç (Rûyan)
13. Güzekaya (Bêgirdê)
14. Güzelkonak (Haruna)
15. Harbanlı
16. İncesu (Seraro)
17. Karakuş
18. Kayacık (of Beyyurdu)
19. Kayacık (of Boğazköy)
20. Kepenek (Kepenekyan)
21. Koçbaşı (Geyman)
22. Mağaraönü (Şkeftan)
23. Meşeli (Bêmlate)
24. Oğlaklı (Meleyan)
25. Olgunlar (Bêbap)
26. Öncü (Reşîdan)
27. Rüzgarlı (Rubunus)
28. Samanlı (Mezre)
29. Sarıca (Zerîk)
30. Seçkin (Zêvkan)
31. Tanyolu (Gelêşim)
32. Tuğlu (Tûyê)
33. Üçgöze (Girik)
34. Üstünağaç (Şawûtê)
35. Üzümkıran (of Ayranlı, Dêhî)
36. Üzümkıran (of Meşelik)
37. Veliköy (Çemê Sofîvelî)
38. Yaman (Zîzan)
39. Yeniceli (Şeyhan)
40. Yeşilbayır (Bêzeno)
41. Yeşilköy (Feqyan)
42. Zorgeçit (Kerketî)

== Population ==
The district is populated by Kurds. Population history from 1997 to 2023 (includes Derecik District until 2018):

Population
Year	Pop.	±%
1997	38,816	—
2007	51,034	+31.5%
2012	67,173	+31.6%
2017	65,941	−1.8%
2022	42,471	−35.6%
2023	44,742	+5.3%
