= Gerdî =

Kurdish tribe

Gerdî (Kurdish: گێردی) is a Kurdish tribe inhabiting all of Derecik District in southeastern Turkey and adjacent parts of Kurdistan Region.
