= Herki (tribe) =

Kurmanji-speaking Sunni Kurdish tribe

Herkî, هەرکی (Kurdish)
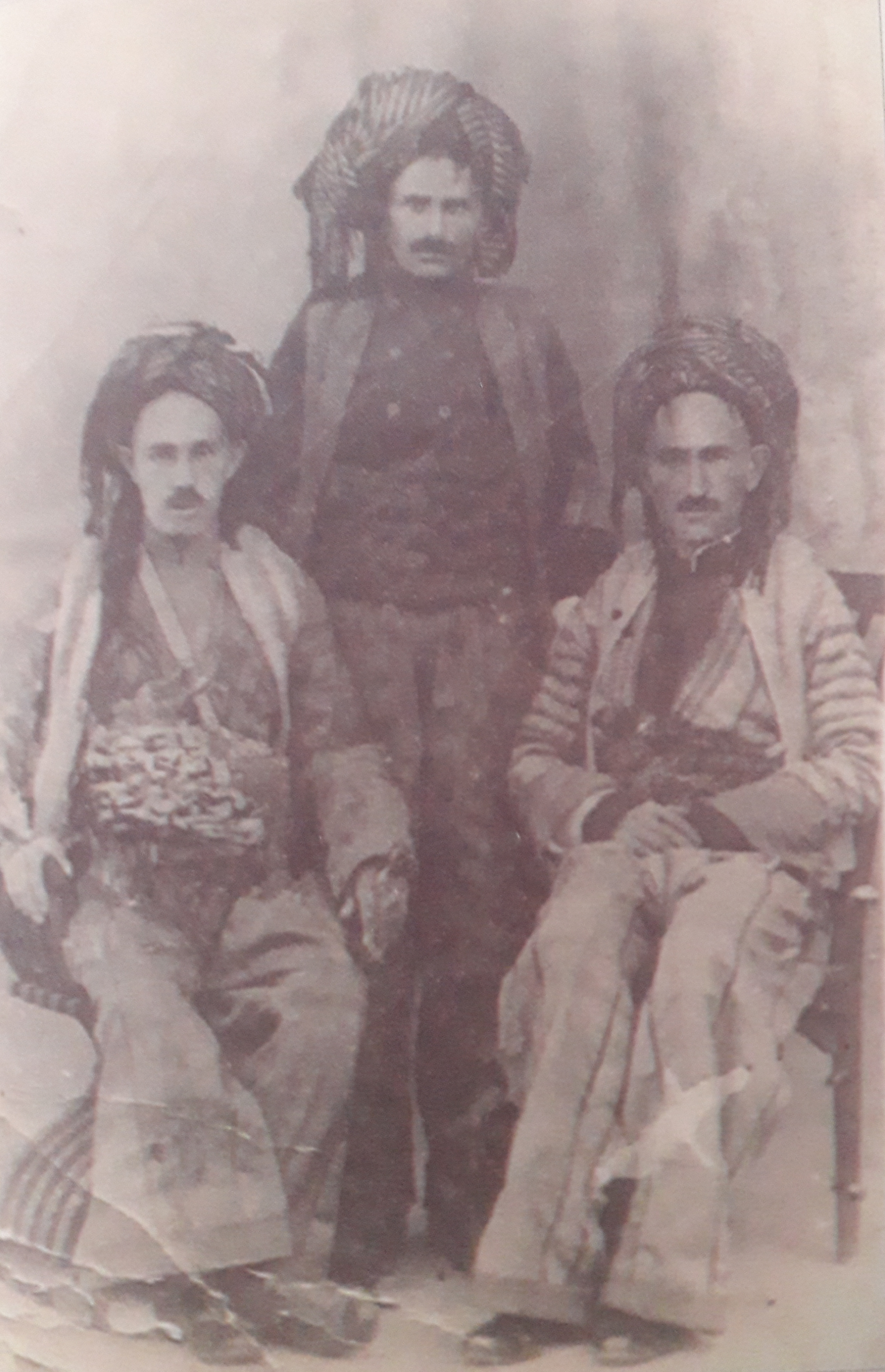
- A group of Herki chieftains, 1944

Total population

Regions with significant populations
- Iraq (Duhok Governorate, Erbil Governorate), Iran (West Azerbaijan Province), Turkey (Hakkâri)

Languages
- Northern Kurdish

Religion
- Sunni Islam (Shafi'i)

Herki, also spelled Harki (Kurdish: Herkî, هەرکی), is a Kurmanji-speaking Kurdish tribe native to the intersection zone between the borders of Iraq, Iran, and Turkey. Herki populations exist in Iraq (Kurdistan Region), Iran (West Azerbaijan Province), and in Turkey (Hakkâri Province). The majority of Herkis lived traditionally as nomads who dealt with animal husbandry, the weaving of intricate textiles, and the transportation of goods between countries. Herkis are predominantly Sunni Muslims of Shafi'i jurisprudence.

== Distribution ==
Estimated Population and Distribution of Herki Tribesmen (19th-20th centuries)
Population	Lifestyle	Region	Date
~4,000	Settled	Şemdinli (Hakkâri Province)	1970s
~20,000	Nomadic, Settled	Akre, Rawanduz, Hakkari mountains	1921
~12,270	Nomadic	Akre, Rawanduz (Mosul Vilayet)	1905
~3,000 (~500 households)	Settled	Şemdinan (Sanjak of Hakkari)	1872
~18,000 (~3,000 households)	Nomadic	(Sanjak of Hakkari)	1872
~900	Nomadic	Akre (Sajak of Mosul)	1847

== Origins ==
According to oral lore, the common ancestor of Herki chieftains was a certain Abū Bakr, a fierce rival of Zayn al-Dīn of Shamdinan. He is said to have had four sons, the prominent ones being Mendō, Sīdō, and Serhāt. Nomadic Herki clans belong to three divisions said to be named after these eponymous ancestors: Mendān, Sīdān, and Serhātī.

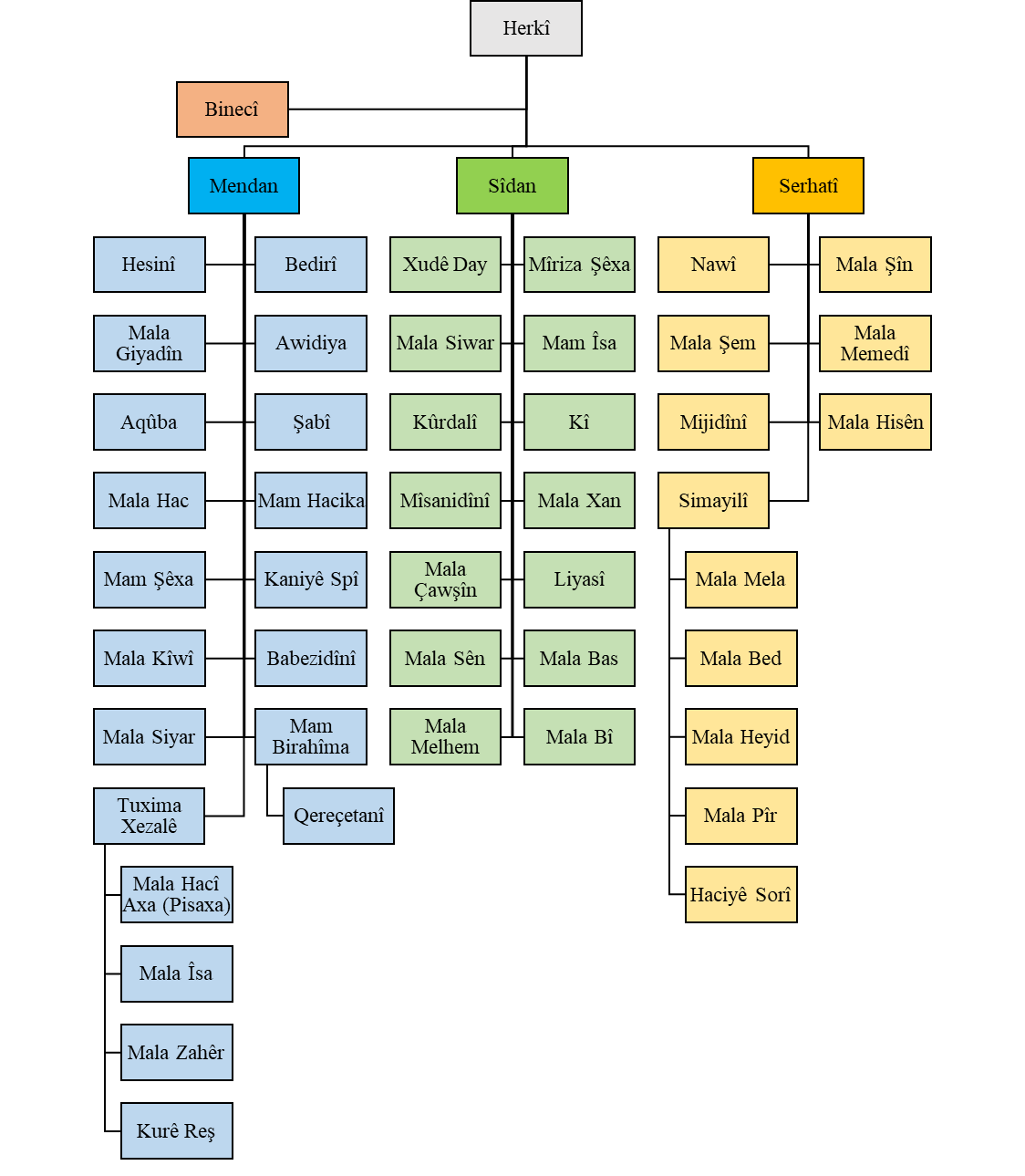
Main divisions and clans of the Herki.

Zirar S. Tewfiq asserts that the Herki are attested in the high medieval period through an individual named Bāw al-Arjī, a deputy of Abu'l-Hayjā’ al-Hakkārī. Al-Azzawi states that it was affirmed to him by Fattah Agha, a Herki chieftain, that the Herki are a Millî tribe.

== History ==
British Indian officer Rupert Hay mentions the Herki as one of three remaining migratory tribes in the region (present-day Iraqi Kurdistan) in the 1910s, the others being the Kheilani and the Boli, with the Herkis being the most important. A section of the tribe was sedentary and lived in the mountains. He states that the Herkis were known for their bravery and that they were armed with modern rifles. Apparently in dispute with Layard, Hay states that they were remarkably well-behaved during his stay in the region. He notes that the nomadic Herkis were led by multiple chieftains and that it was customary for the Ottomans to appoint one annually as a spokesman for the whole tribe.

Some Herki families, particularly from the Salaranî branch, migrated around 200 years ago from Şemzinan (Şemdinli) and settled on the slopes of Mount Halgurd, where they founded the village of Shora (Şore) in the Choman District of the Kurdistan Region of Iraq. The community maintains strong cultural and ancestral ties to the Herki tribe of Hakkâri.
