= Assyrians in Iran =

Ethnic Group in Iran

ܣܘܪ̈ܝܐ ܕܐܝܼܪܵܢ آشوریان ایران
- (Assyrian homeland) (Iran)
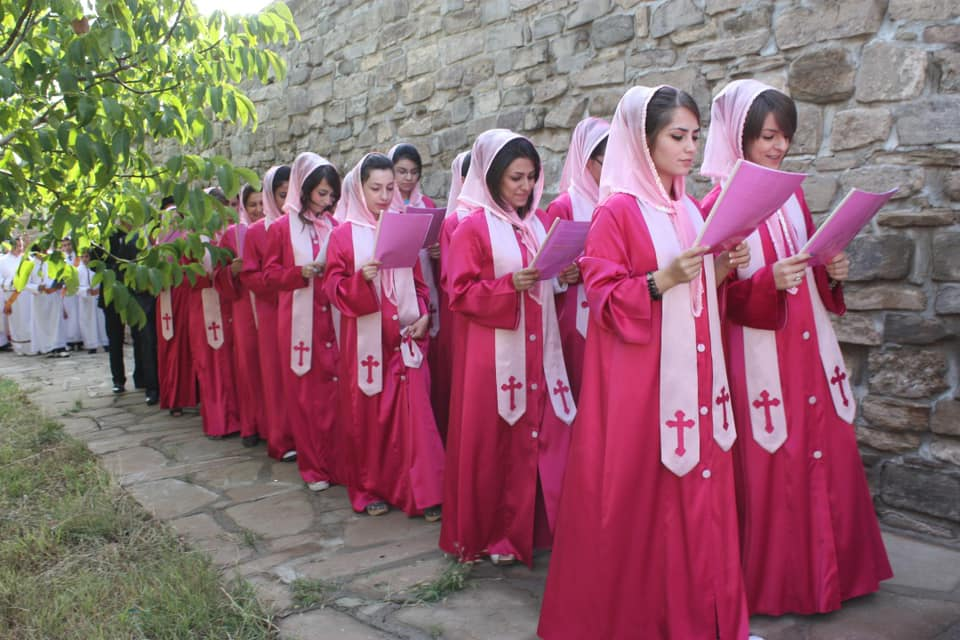
- Iranian Assyrian women in Urmia

Total population
- 20,000-55,000

Regions with significant populations
- Tehran, West Azerbaijan Province (Urmia, Salmas)

Languages
- Neo-Aramaic and Azerbaijani Turkic &Persian

Religion
- Syriac Christianity

Assyrians in Iran (Syriac: ܣܘܪ̈ܝܐ ܕܐܝܼܪܵܢ; Persian: آشوریان ایران), or Iranian Assyrians, are an ethnic and linguistic minority in present-day Iran. The Assyrians of Iran speak Assyrian Neo-Aramaic, a neo-Aramaic language descended from the eastern dialects of the old Aramaic language with elements of Akkadian, and are Eastern Rite Christians belonging mostly to the Assyrian Church of the East and also to the Ancient Church of the East, Assyrian Pentecostal Church, Chaldean Catholic Church and Assyrian Evangelical Church.

They share a common history and ethnic identity, rooted in shared linguistic, cultural and religious traditions, with Assyrians in Iraq, Assyrians in Turkey and Assyrians in Syria, as well as with the Assyrian diaspora.

The Assyrian community in Iran numbered approximately 200,000 prior to the Islamic Revolution of 1979. In 1987, there were an estimated 50,000 Assyrians living in Tehran. However, after the revolution many Assyrians left the country, primarily for the United States; the 1996 Iranian census counted only 32,000 Assyrians. Current estimates of the Assyrian population in Iran consist of 7,000 combined members of the Assyrian Church of the East and Chaldean Catholic Church in addition to less than 10,000 members of the Assyrian Evangelical Church.

The Iranian capital, Tehran, is home to the majority of Iranian Assyrians; however, approximately 15,000 Assyrians reside in northern Iran, in Urmia and various Assyrian villages in the surrounding area. To note among the Assyrian diaspora, the Assyrians residing in California and Russia tend to be originally from Iran.

The Constitution of the Islamic Republic of Iran, ratified in 1979, recognizes Assyrians as a religious minority and ethnic minority and reserves for them one seat in the Islamic Consultative Assembly, the Iranian parliament. As of 2004, the seat was occupied by Yonathan Betkolia, who was elected in 2000 and reelected in the 2004 legislative election.

In 2010, it was estimated that there were only around 5,000 Assyrians left in the historical center of the city of Urmia.

== History ==
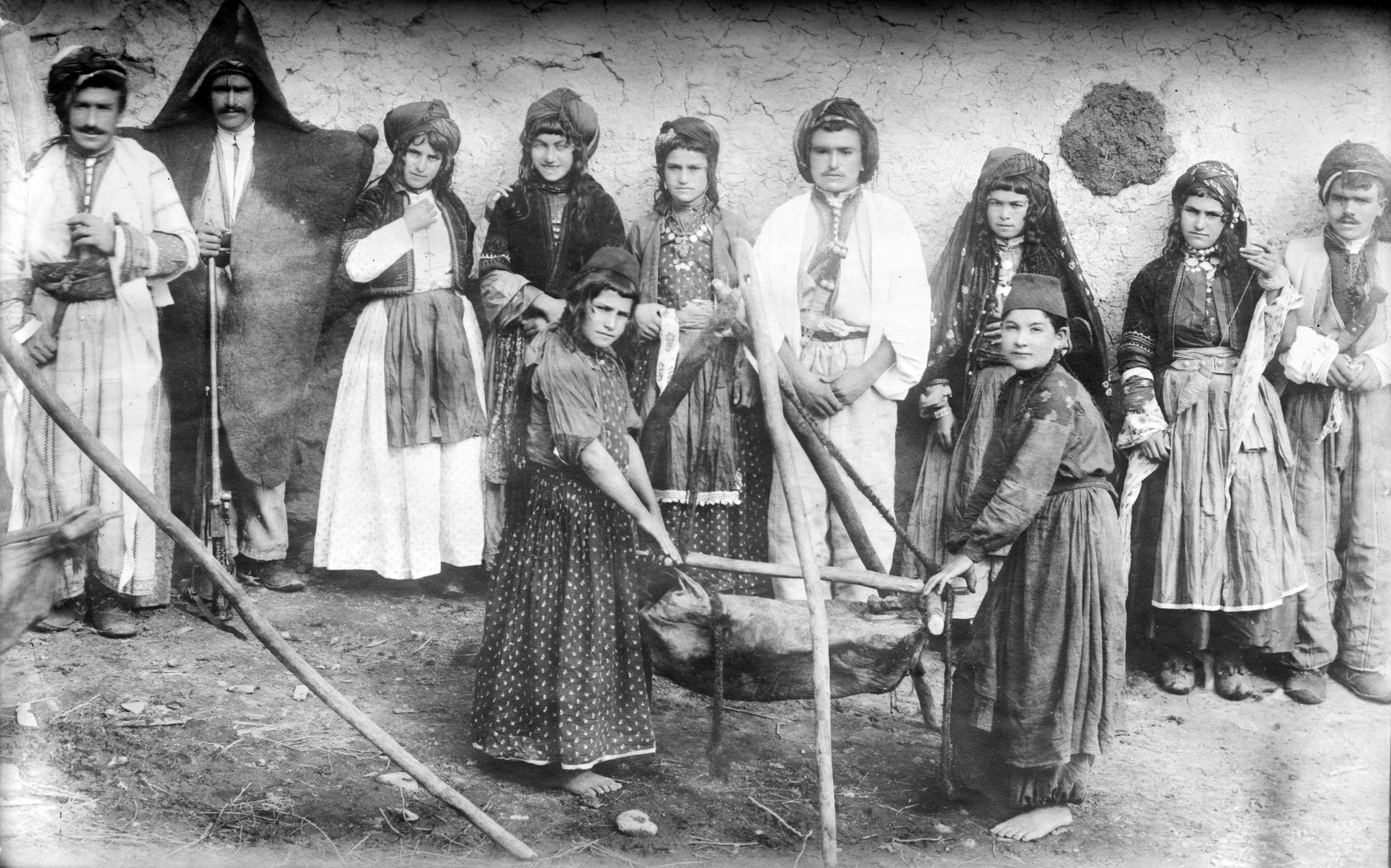
Assyrians producing butter in Persia

The Assyrian presence in Iran goes back 4,000 years to ancient times, and Assyria was involved in the history of Ancient Iran even before the arrival of the modern Iranian peoples to the region circa 1000 BC. During the Old Assyrian Empire (c.2025-1750 BC) and Middle Assyrian Empire (1365-1020 BC) the Assyrians ruled over parts of Pre-Iranic northern and western Iran. The Neo-Assyrian Empire (911-605 BC) saw Assyria conquer the Iranic Persians, Medes and Parthians into their empire, together with the ancient pre-Iranic Elamites, Kassites, Manneans and Gutians, and also the Iranic Cimmerians of Asia Minor and Scythians of the Caucasus. The home of the Assyrians in Iran has traditionally been along the western shore of Lake Urmia from the Salmas area to the Urmia plain.

After the fall of Assyria between 612 and 599 BC, after decades of civil war, followed by an attack by an alliance of former subject peoples; the Medes, Persians, Babylonians, Chaldeans, Scythians and Cimmerians, its people became an integral part of the Achaemenid Empire (as did Assyria itself), holding important military, civic and economic positions, and the Achaemenid Persians, having spent centuries under Assyrian domination, were greatly influenced by Assyrian Art and Architecture, modelled their empire upon Assyrian lines, and saw themselves as the successors of the great Assyrian kings. Assyrians are still attested as being extant in the north west of the region during the Parthian Empire (160 BC-223 AD) and Sassanid Empire (224-650 AD), and throughout the Middle Ages, where the Bukhtishu family of physicians were held in great regard by the Persian kings.

There were about 200,000 Assyrians in Iran at the time of the 1976 census. Many emigrated after the revolution in 1979, but at least 50,000 were estimated to be still in Iran in 1987.

In 1900, Assyrians numbered over 76,000 in northwestern Iran, constituting over a quarter of the Azerbaijan province's population and were the largest non-Muslim majority in Urmia. Of the 300 villages around Urmia, 60 were exclusively Assyrians and 60 were mixed villages with Assyrian, Armenian, and Azeri communities. Nevertheless, there were over 115 documented Assyrian villages to the west of Lake Urmia prior to 1918.

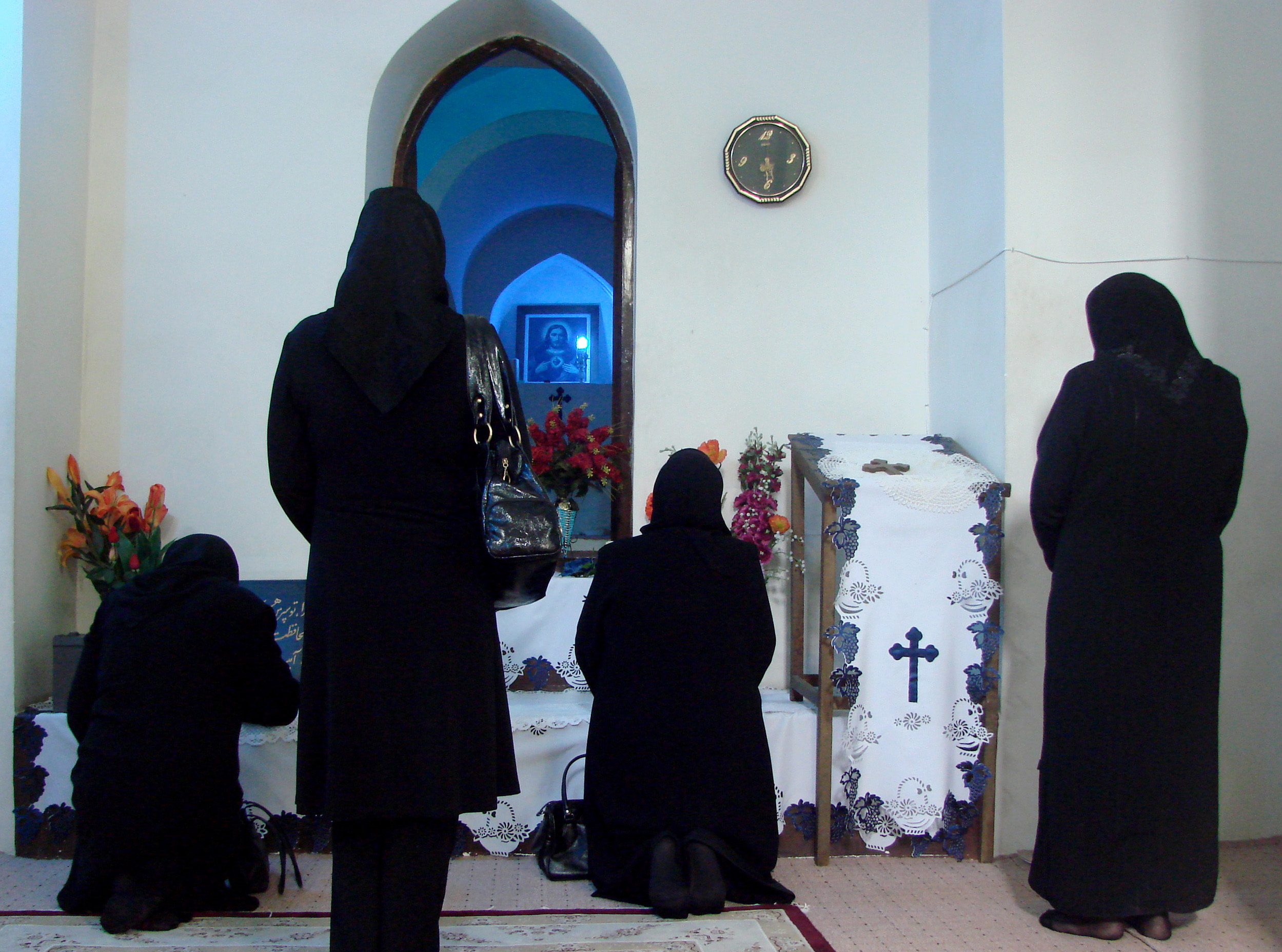
Assyrian Christian women praying in Mart Maryam Church in Urmia, Iran.

During the Assyrian genocide, which took place during World War I, the Ottoman Army together with allied Kurdish and Arab militias along the Persian-Turkish and Persian-Iraqi border carried out religiously and ethnically motivated massacres and deportations on unarmed Assyrian civilians (and Armenians) both in the mountains and on the rich plains, resulting in the death of at least 300,000 Assyrians. This genocide that started in 1914 was said to be started with the Ottomans’ ‘Jihad’ declaration, apparently solely based on its ethnic and religious differences with the Assyrians because of their belief in Christianity, but actually there was an ambition to extend their ‘holy war’ beyond Assyrian territories to spread its Ottoman influences.

The Ottomans already implemented massacres of several Assyrian tribes from 1843 to 1845, with the motive of taking over their ancestral lands and making them part of the Ottoman Empire. These tribes were particularly the Tiyari, Tkhuma, Jilu and Baz, who all refused Ottoman command. According to British councils, 10,000 Assyrians were massacred already during this time alone. Women and children were taken while Assyrian leaders were cast out from Ottoman forces. Assyrians felt forced to convert to for example Catholicism or Russian Orthodoxy to receive help from the Russian, French or British.

In 1914 alone, they attacked dozens of villages and drove off all the inhabitants of the district of Gawar. The Assyrians defended themselves and for a time successfully repelled further attacks under the leadership of Agha Petros, seizing control of much of the Urmia region and defeating Ottoman forces and their Kurdish and Arab allies in the process. However, lack of ammunition and supplies, due mainly to the withdrawal of Russia from the war, and the collapse of allied Armenian forces led to their downfall. Massively outnumbered, surrounded, undersupplied and cut off, the Assyrians suffered terrible massacres. These included Assyrian deportations close to the Ottoman-Persian border in January 1915, as well as the invasion of several Assyrian tribes located in the Hakkari mountains. This area already suffered numerous massacres in the 1840s.

By the summer of 1918 almost all surviving Assyrians had fled to Tehran or to existing Assyrian communities or refugee camps in Iraq such as Baqubah. Local Kurds and Arabs and took the opportunity of the last phases of World War I to rob Assyrian homes, murder civilians and leave those remaining destitute. The critical murder that sowed panic in the Assyrian community came when Kurdish militias, under Agha Ismail Simko, assassinated the Patriarch, Shimun XIX Benyamin, on March 3, 1918, under the pretext of inviting him to negotiations, although the Assyrian leader Malik Khoshaba exacted revenge upon Simko by attacking and sacking his citadel, forcing the Kurdish leader to flee for his life.

== Religious communities ==
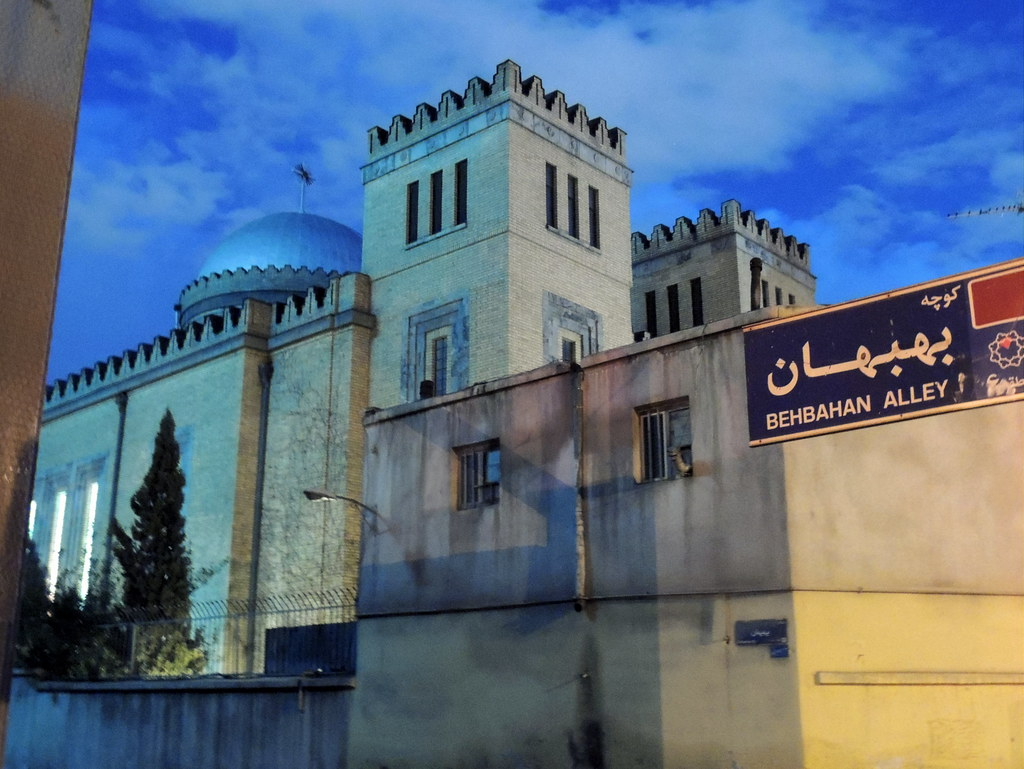
St. Joseph Chaldean Catholic Church, Tehran

Most Assyrians in Iran are followers of the Assyrian Church of the East, with a minority of 3,900 following the Chaldean Catholic Church. Some also follow Protestant denominations such as the Assyrian Evangelical Church, Assyrian Pentecostal Church and possibly Russian Orthodoxy due to a Russian Ecclesiastical Mission in Urmia during the 1900s.

== Distribution ==
- Urmia (Syriac: ܐܘܪܡܝܐ):
  - Abajalu, Abdulkandi, Adeh (ܥܕܐ), Aliabad, Aliawach, Alikumi, Alqayeh, Anhar, Ardishai, Armutaghaj, Babarud, Badelbu, Badiki, Balanush, Balu, Borashan, Chamaki, Chamashajan, Charagushi, Charbakhsh (چهاربخش (ارومیه)), Darbarut, Digala (دیگاله), Dizataka, Diszgeri, Gawilan, Geogtapa, Lower Gniza, Upper Gniza, Gulpashin/Gulpashan, Gowzgavand, Hesar Babaganja, Ikiaghaj, Iryawa, Jamlawa, Khanishan, Kosi, Lulpa, Mushawa, Nazlu, Piqabaklu, Qala, Qara-Aghaj, Qarajalu, Qaragoz, Qasemlu, Qezel Ashuq, Qurtapa, Saatlu, Sainabad, Sangar, Saralan, Sardarud, Shirabad (ܫܝܪܐܒܕ), Sir, Sopurghan, Taka, Tarmani, Tazakand, Urmia, Vazirabad, Yaghmiralu, Yengija, Zumalan (ܙܘܡܠܢ).
- Margawar:
  - Diza, Gerdik, Gullistan, Nergi, Razhani.
- Targawar (Syriac: ܬܪܓܘܪ):
  - Anbi, Balulan, Darband, Dastalan, Haki, Mavana (ܡܥܘܢܐ), Qurana, Salona, Shibani, Tuleki, Tulu.
- Sumay Baradust:
  - Gangachin, Tazakand.
- Salmas (Syriac: ܣܵܠܵܡܵܣ)::
  - Akhtekhana, Chara, Delemon (دیلمقان), Guliser, Khanaga, Khosrawa, Mahlam, Patamur, Qederabad, Sarna, Sawra, Ulah, Zewajik.

== Churches ==
=== Urmia ===
Church	Location	Date	Denomination	Location	Photo
Old Mart Maryam (St. Mary)	Urmia	Early Christianity	ACOE/ROC	🌐	
New Mart Maryam (St. Mary)	Urmia	1964	ACOE	🌐	
Mart Maryam (St. Mary)	Urmia	1885/1954	CCC	🌐	
Assyrian Evangelical Church, Urmia	Urmia	1961	AEC	🌐	
Mar Kuriakus (St. Cyriacus)	Urmia	5th c.	ACOE	🌐	
Mart Maryam (St. Mary)	Charbakhsh (fa)	7th c./1905	ACOE	🌐	
Mart Maryam (St. Mary)	Digala (fa)	19th c.	ACOE	🌐	
Mar Gevargis (St. George)	Sangar Borzu-Khan	1922/1993	ACOE	🌐	
Mar Gevargis (St. George)	Alvach			🌐	
Mart Maryam (St. Mary)	Janvislu			🌐	
Mar Sargis-Bacchus (Sts. Sergius and Bacchus)	Seir	7th c.	ACOE	🌐	
Mar Addai (St. Thaddeus)	Alqian	15th c.		🌐	
Mar Gabriel (Holy Gabriel)	Ordushahi	1863	CCC	🌐	
Mart Maryam (St. Mary)	Ordushahi			🌐	
Mar Sargis (St. Sergius)	Takyeh		ACOE	🌐	
Mar Gevargis (St. George)	Takyeh			🌐	
Mar T'oma (St. Thomas)	Babarud		ACOE	🌐	
Mar Gevargis (St. George)	Babarud		CCC	🌐	
Mar Gevargis (St. George)	Qurt Tappeh	1889	ACOE	🌐	
Mar Gevargis (St. George)	Chehreh Gosha	19th c./2001		🌐	
Mart Maryam (St. Mary)	Gok Tepe			🌐	
Mar Zayya (St. Zayya)	Gok Tepe	16th c./1889/1957	ACOE	🌐	
Mar Gevargis (St. George) (fa)	Gulpashan	1869	CCC	🌐	
Mar Sehyon (Holy Zion)	Gulpashan		ACOE	🌐	
Mar Petros-Polos (Sts. Peter and Paul)	Kelisakandi	8th c.	CCC	🌐	
Mar Gevargis (St. George)	Reyhanabad	1914	ACOE	🌐	
Mar Abdishu (Odishu) (St. Abdishu)	Tarmani	1929	ACOE	🌐	
Mar Qardagh (St. Qardagh)	Tarmani			🌐	
Mar Gevargis (St. George)	Vazirabad			🌐	
Mar Gevargis (St. George)	Yaghmur Ali	20th c.		🌐	
Rabban Mar Hormizd (St. Hormizd)	Dizaj-e Takyeh	9th c.	ACOE	🌐	
Mar Shalita (St. Artemius)	Dizaj-e Takyeh		ACOE	🌐	
Mar Gevargis (St. George)	Saatlu	18th c./1971		🌐	
Mar Yukhana (St. John)	Saatlu			🌐	
Mart Shmoni (St. Solomonia)	Shams-e Hajjian			🌐	
Mar Sargis (St. Sergius)	Kukia			🌐	
Mar Gevargis (St. George)	Mahmudabad			🌐	
Mar Shalita (St. Artemius)	near Mahmudabad			🌐	
Mart Maryam (St. Mary)	Nivlu			🌐	
Mar Gevargis (St. George)	Tazekand			🌐	
Mart Maryam (St. Mary)	Anhar	1885	ACOE	🌐	
Mar Shalita (St. Artemius)	Qezel Asheq	1967	ACOE	🌐	
Mar Gabriel (Gavra) (Holy Gabriel)	Zeynalu		ACOE	🌐	
Mart Maryam (St. Mary)	Faqibeyglu			🌐	
Mar Gevargis (St. George)	Faqibeyglu			🌐	
Mart Khanna (St. Anne) (fa)	Jamalabad		ACOE	🌐	
Mar Yukhana (St. John)	near Gavelan	5th c.	ACOE	🌐	
Mart Maryam (St. Mary)	Gavelan	1952	CCC	🌐	
Mar Gevargis (St. George)	Gavelan	19th c.	AEC	🌐	
Mar Daniel (Prophet Daniel)	Adeh	5th c.	ACOE	🌐	
Mar Yukhana (St. John) (fa)	Adeh	1901	ACOE	🌐	
Mar Yusep (St. Joseph)	Adeh	19th c.	CCC	🌐	
Mart Maryam (St. Mary)	Chamaki	1870	ACOE	🌐	
Mar Savrishu (St. Sabrisho)	Mushabad	1880/1914	ACOE	🌐	
Mar Nukha (Prophet Noah)	near Mushabad		ACOE	🌐	
Mar Gevargis (St. George) (fa)	Sopurghan	1873	ACOE	🌐	
Mart Maryam (St. Mary)	Yengejeh			🌐	
Mar Gabriel (Gavra) (Holy Gabriel)	Armudaghaj		ACOE	🌐	
Mar Gevargis (St. George)	Janizeh	19th c.	ACOE	🌐	
Mart Maryam (St. Mary)	Kavsi	1909		🌐	
Mart Maryam (St. Mary)	Nazlu	19th c./2022		🌐	
Mar Behishu (St. Paisius)	Qaleh Esmail Aqa	1965	ACOE	🌐	
Mar Gevargis (St. George)	Abdollahkandi, near Taltava			🌐	
Mar Gevargis (St. George)	Ikiaghaj, near Qelinjlu			🌐	
Mar Shalita (St. Artemius)	Shirabad			🌐	
Mar Aprim (St. Ephrem)	Zonbalan	1880/2005		🌐	
Mar Toma (St. Thomas)	Balowlan	5th/7th c./1987	ACOE	🌐	
Mar Gevargis (St. George)	Haki			🌐	
Mart Maryam (St. Mary) (fa)	Mavana	1879	CCC	🌐	
Rabban Mar Hormizd (St. Hormizd)	Dazgir			🌐	

=== Salmas ===
Church	Location	Date	Denomination	Location	Photo
Mar Kuriakus (St. Cyriacus) (fa)	Kohneh Shahr	12th c.	ACOE	🌐	
Vank (fa)	Khosrowabad	5th c.	ACOE	🌐	
Mar Gevargis (St. George) (fa)	Khosrowabad	11th/13th c.	CCC	🌐	
Mar Yukhana (St. John)	Patavir		ACOE	🌐	
Mar Yaghou (St. James)	Patavir	1966	CCC	🌐	
Mart Maryam (St. Mary)	Savra			🌐	

=== Other Cities ===
Church	Location	Date	Denomination	Location	Photo
Khark Assyrian Monastery (fa)	Khark Island	5th c.		🌐	
Mar Gevargis (St. George)	Tehran	1961	ACOE	🌐	
Mart Maryam (St. Mary)	Tehran	1978	ACOE	🌐	
Mar Yusep (St. Joseph)	Tehran	1950	CCC	🌐	
Mart Maryam (St. Mary)	Tehran	1951	CCC	🌐	
Mar T'oma (St. Thomas)	Tehran	1967	AEC	🌐	
Mar T'oma (St. Thomas)(fa)	Tehran	1959	APC	🌐	
	Fardis	2011	ACOE	🌐	
Mart Maryam (St. Mary) (fa)	Senneh	19th c.	CCC	🌐	
Assyrian Evangelical Church, Tabriz	Tabriz	1957	AEC	🌐	
Assyrian Pentecostal Church, Kermanshah	Kermanshah	1955	APC	🌐	
Mart Maryam (St. Mary) (fa)	Qazvin	1915	CCC	🌐	
Mart Maryam (St. Mary) (fa)	Hamadan	19th c.	CCC	🌐	
Mar Shimeon (St. Simeon)	Ahwaz	1964	CCC	🌐	
Mart Maryam (St. Mary) demolished in 2007 (fa)	Andimeshk	1954	CCC	🌐	

== Famous Assyrians from Iran ==
- Bukhtishu family, famous physicians in the Middle Ages
- Nicholas I Zaya, patriarch of Chaldean Catholic Church
- Hannibal Alkhas, poet and visual artist
- Evin Agassi, music artist
- Ramona Amiri, Miss World Canada 2005
- Ashurbanipal Babilla, actor, theatre director, playwright and visual artist
- Steven Beitashour, MLS player
- Patrick Bet-David, entrepreneur, author and YouTuber
- George Bit Atanus, designed the current Assyrian flag in 1968.
- Beneil Dariush, MMA fighter
- Jack Douglas, television personality
- Eprime Eshag, Fellow of Wadham College, Oxford
- Alexander L. George, Graham H. Stuart Professor of Political Science Emeritus at Stanford University
- Mar Youhannan Semaan Issayi, Archbishop of Assyro-Chaldean Metropolitan Tehran
- George Malek-Yonan, procured a seat in the Iranian Parliament for Assyrians
- Rosie Malek-Yonan, actress, author and activist
- Younan Nowzaradan, Assyrian-American physician and television personality (My 600-lb Life)
- Andrew David Urshan, evangelist and author

== See also ==
- Christians in Iran
- Ethnic minorities in Iran
- List of Assyrian settlements
- Religious minorities in Iran
- Russian Ecclesiastical Mission in Urmia
- Assyrian Evangelical Church
- Assyrian Pentecostal Church
- Da'tid Bahrana
- Urmia Orthodokseta

== Bibliography ==
- Eden Naby, “The Assyrians of Iran: Reunification of a ‘Millat,’ 1906-1914" International Journal of Middle East Studies, 8. (1977) pp. 237–249
- Eden Naby, “The Iranian Frontier Nationalities: The Kurds, the Assyrians, the Baluch and the Turkmens,”Soviet Asian Ethnic Frontiers, ed.by McCagg and Silver (New York, Pergamon Press, 1979).
- Eden Naby, “Christian Assyrian Architecture of Iran,” News – Harvard University Center for the Study of World Religions (Spring 1998) vol. 5, no. 2, p. 7, 10.
- Eden Naby, "Ishtar: Documenting the Crisis in the Assyrian Iranian Community," MERIA 10/4 (2006)https://web.archive.org/web/20090124055153/http://meria.idc.ac.il/journal/2006/issue4/Naby.pdf
