= Ordushahi =

Village in West Azerbaijan province, Iran

Ordushahi Persian: اردوشاهي
- Village
- Location within Iran
- Coordinates: 37°27′07″N 45°15′29″E
- Country: Iran
- Province: West Azerbaijan
- County: Urmia
- District: Central
- Rural District: Torkaman

Population (2016)
  - Total: 418
- Time zone: UTC+3:30 (IRST)

Ordushahi (Persian: اردوشاهي, romanized: Ordūshāhī; Syriac: Ardishai) (Note: Also known as Emām Kandī (امام كندي), Ardishi, Ardichay, Ardichaï, Ardeshahi, Ardishāy, Ardišaï, Ardishahi, Ordoshāhī, and Orduchaï.) is a village in Torkaman Rural District of the Central District in Urmia County, West Azerbaijan province, Iran.

== History ==
A French Lazarist mission noted the presence of Catholics at Ardishai in 1840. The Church of the Archangel Gabriel at Ardishai was constructed in the 19th century. Ardishai was inhabited by 183 Church of the East Christian families and served by the Church of Mār Ḥnānyā, the Church of Mār Shallīṭā, the Church of Mart Maryam, and the Church of Malakā Gabriel, but did not have a priest, in 1862, according to the Russian archimandrite Sophoniah.

There were 160 Church of the East Christian families and 2 priests and 5 churches at Ardishai in 1877, as per Edward Lewes Cutts. The Church of Mār Sabrīshōʿ at Ardishai is mentioned in the 1890s. François Lesné, the Apostolic delegate of the Roman Catholic Church in Iran, recorded in a letter to the Lazarist Emile Sontag at Tehran that Ardishai was attacked by Kurds in 1908. Muhtasham es-Saltaneh, governor of Urmia, had provided weapons to an Assyrian committee led by Faramarz Khan with responsibility for the protection of Shimshājeyan, Dīzātakā, Ardishai, and Gūgtāpāh, which were designated as places of refuge for people from smaller villages.

It was populated by 330 Chaldean Catholics with 1 priest and 1 church in 1913 as part of the Chaldean Catholic Archeparchy of Urmia. Prior to the First World War, there were 300 Assyrian houses at Ardishai, as per the list presented by Agha Petros to the Lausanne Peace Conference in 1922. It was located in the Baranduz district. Basil Nikitin, the Russian consul at Urmia, recorded that the village was entirely populated by Christians just before the First World War. In early 1915, the Christians at Ardishai attempted to organise resistance against the Turkish invasion. However, the village was destroyed and 75 women and girls who fled into Lake Urmia to escape the Turks were shot as they stood in the water, according to the American Methodist medical missionary Jacob Sargis.

== Ecclesiastical history ==
The Church of the East diocese of Ardishai is first attested in 1831. Edward Lewes Cutts noted the presence of several tombs of bishops at Ardishai in 1876, suggesting the diocese had existed since at least the 18th century. The bishop of Ardishai was traditionally called Gabriel. Gabriel, metropolitan of Aḏārbaigān, is known to have arrived at Malabar in 1708 and made a Catholic profession of faith on 5 October 1712. Khidr of Mosul noted a bishop named Gabriel of a diocese in the Urmia region in 1734.

The metropolitan Gabriel of Ardishai was born in 1810 and became metropolitan at the age of 13 in 1824. He was described as hostile towards the American missionaries but sympathetic towards the Lazarists who he had permitted to build a Catholic church at Ardishai. In 1862, Gabriel also tended to the villages of Anhar, Sangar, Dīza, Bādālābād, Patōlā, Takā, Takālūi, Sarībajlūi, Nāzārābād, Shīnābād, and Qūrtāpāh. He died on 11 October 1871. The diocese of Ardishai included 90 villages, 40 churches, 28 priests, and 2888 families in 1877.

The diocese of Gūgtāpāh was absorbed into the diocese of Ardishai upon the death of its bishop in the second half of the 19th century. Gabriel was succeeded by another metropolitan named Gabriel; he converted to the Russian Orthodox Church in 1874, but returned to the Church of the East in the following year. He was assassinated by Shaikh Saddik d'Nehri, grandson of Obeidallah, in June 1896. The diocese of Ardishai consequently ceased to exist as Gabriel was not replaced likely as most of the Church of the East Christians in the diocese had converted to the Russian Orthodox Church soon afterwards.

== Demographics ==
=== Population ===
At the time of the 2006 National Census, the village's population was 451 in 111 households. The following census in 2011 counted 428 people in 130 households. The 2016 census measured the population of the village as 418 people in 135 households.

== Bibliography ==
- Aboona, Hirmis (2008). Assyrians, Kurds, and Ottomans: Intercommunal Relations on the Periphery of the Ottoman Empire. Cambria Press.
- Al-Jeloo, Nicholas (2015). "Persian Christians: Assyrian art and architecture of Urmia as an example of regional cultural expression". Parole de l’Orient. 40: 13–27.
- Fiey, Jean Maurice (1993). Pour un Oriens Christianus Novus: Répertoire des diocèses syriaques orientaux et occidentaux (in French).
- Gaunt, David (2006). Massacres, Resistance, Protectors: Muslim-Christian Relations in Eastern Anatolia during World War I. Gorgias Press.
- Hellot-Bellier, Florence (2017). "The Resistance of Urmia Assyrians to Violence at the Beginning of the Twentieth Century". In David Gaunt; Naures Atto; Soner O. Barthoma (eds.). Let Them Not Return: Sayfo – The Genocide against the Assyrian, Syriac and Chaldean Christians in the Ottoman Empire (PDF). pp. 70–99.
- Wilmshurst, David (2000). The Ecclesiastical Organisation of the Church of the East, 1318–1913 (PDF). Peeters Publishers.
