= Satlu, West Azerbaijan =

Satlu ساعتلو
- Village
- Location within Iran
- Coordinates: 37°25′18″N 45°08′54″E
- Country: Iran
- Province: West Azerbaijan
- County: Urmia
- Bakhsh: Central
- Rural District: Baranduzchay-ye Shomali

Population (2006)
  - Total: 77
- Time zone: UTC+3:30 (IRST)
  - Summer (DST): UTC+4:30 (IRDT)

Satlu (Persian: ساعتلو, romanized: Sā‘tlū; Syriac: Sāʿātlūi) (Note: Also known as Sā‘atlū, Saatlou, Saatlu, Sā‘atlū-ye Bīvaleh, and Saatlouwi.) is a village in Baranduzchay-ye Shomali Rural District, in the Central District of Urmia County, West Azerbaijan Province, Iran. At the 2006 census, its population was 77, in 29 families.

== History ==
In 1862, Sāʿātlūi (today called Satlu) with ʿĀlyābād was inhabited by 70 Church of the East Christian families who were served by the Church of Mār Ḥnānyā and 1 priest, according to the Russian archimandrite Sophoniah. It was located in the Baranduz District. There were 44 Church of the East Christian families at Sāʿātlūi in 1877 with 1 church and no priests, as per Edward Lewes Cutts. Basil Nikitin recorded that the village was populated by Christians and Muslims just before the First World War. Prior to the First World War, there were 200 Assyrian houses at Sāʿātlūi, as per the list presented by Agha Petros to the Lausanne Peace Conference in 1922.

== Bibliography ==
- Gaunt, David (2006). Massacres, Resistance, Protectors: Muslim-Christian Relations in Eastern Anatolia during World War I. Gorgias Press.
- Hellot-Bellier, Florence (2017). "The Resistance of Urmia Assyrians to Violence at the Beginning of the Twentieth Century". In David Gaunt; Naures Atto; Soner O. Barthoma (eds.). Let Them Not Return: Sayfo – The Genocide against the Assyrian, Syriac and Chaldean Christians in the Ottoman Empire (PDF). pp. 70–99.
- Wilmshurst, David (2000). The Ecclesiastical Organisation of the Church of the East, 1318–1913 (PDF). Peeters Publishers.
