= Babarud, West Azerbaijan =

Village in West Azerbaijan province, Iran

Babarud Persian: بابارود
- Village
- Location within Iran
- Coordinates: 37°24′00″N 45°14′06″E
- Country: Iran
- Province: West Azerbaijan
- County: Urmia
- District: Central
- Rural District: Torkaman

Population (2016)
  - Total: 634
- Time zone: UTC+3:30 (IRST)

Babarud (Persian: بابارود, romanized: Bābārūd) (Note: Also known as Babari, Babaroud, and Bébaré.) is a village in Torkaman Rural District of the Central District in Urmia County, West Azerbaijan province, Iran.

== History ==
A French Lazarist mission noted the presence of Catholics at Bābārūd in 1840. It was inhabited by 60 Church of the East Christian families in 1862 with no priest or church, according to the Russian archimandrite Sophoniah. There were 115 Church of the East Christian families at Bābārūd in 1877 with no priest or church as per Edward Lewes Cutts. François Lesné, the Apostolic delegate of the Roman Catholic Church in Iran, recorded in a letter to the Lazarist Emile Sontag at Tehran that Bābārūd was looted and burned by Kurds in 1908 and the church was ransacked. In 1913, there were 120 Chaldean Catholics in the village, who had one church without a priest, as part of the Chaldean Catholic Archeparchy of Urmia. Basil Nikitin, the Russian consul at Urmia, recorded that the village was populated by Christians and Muslims just before the First World War. Prior to the First World War, there were 130 Assyrian houses at Bābārūd, as per the list presented by Agha Petros to the Lausanne Peace Conference in 1922. It was located in the Baranduz district.

== Demographics ==
=== Population ===
At the time of the 2006 National Census, the village's population was 615 in 125 households. The following census in 2011 counted 647 people in 164 households. The 2016 census measured the population of the village as 634 people in 181 households. It was the most populous village in its rural district.

== Bibliography ==
- Gaunt, David (2006). Massacres, Resistance, Protectors: Muslim-Christian Relations in Eastern Anatolia during World War I. Gorgias Press.
- Hellot-Bellier, Florence (2017). "The Resistance of Urmia Assyrians to Violence at the Beginning of the Twentieth Century". In David Gaunt; Naures Atto; Soner O. Barthoma (eds.). Let Them Not Return: Sayfo – The Genocide against the Assyrian, Syriac and Chaldean Christians in the Ottoman Empire (PDF). pp. 70–99.
- Wilmshurst, David (2000). The Ecclesiastical Organisation of the Church of the East, 1318–1913 (PDF). Peeters Publishers.
