= Chehreh Gosha =

Chehreh Gosha چهره گشا
- Village
- Location within Iran
- Coordinates: 37°32′41″N 45°09′32″E
- Country: Iran
- Province: West Azerbaijan
- County: Urmia
- Bakhsh: Central
- Rural District: Bakeshluchay

Population (2006)
  - Total: 243
- Time zone: UTC+3:30 (IRST)
  - Summer (DST): UTC+4:30 (IRDT)

Chehreh Gosha (Persian: چهره گشا, romanized: Chehreh Goshā; Syriac: Chahārgūshi) (Note: Also known as Djarakosch and Tchragouchi.) is a village in Bakeshluchay Rural District, in the Central District of Urmia County, West Azerbaijan Province, Iran. At the 2006 census, its population was 243, in 61 families.

== History ==
Chahārgūshi was populated by 30 Church of the East Christian families in 1862 and was served by the Church of Mār ‘Abdīshō but did not have a priest, according to the Russian archimandrite Sophoniah. It was located in the Baranduz district. There were 42 Church of the East Christian families with 1 priest and 1 church at Chahārgūshi in 1877, as per Edward Lewes Cutts. Chahārgūshi was inhabited by 500 Chaldean Catholics with 1 priest and 1 church in 1913 as part of the Chaldean Catholic Archeparchy of Urmia. Basil Nikitin, the Russian consul at Urmia, noted that Chahārgūshi was entirely populated by Christians just before the First World War. Prior to the First World War, there were 200 Assyrian houses at Chahārgūshi, as per the list presented by Agha Petros to the Lausanne Peace Conference in 1922.

== Bibliography ==
- Gaunt, David (2006). Massacres, Resistance, Protectors: Muslim-Christian Relations in Eastern Anatolia during World War I. Gorgias Press.
- Wilmshurst, David (2000). The Ecclesiastical Organisation of the Church of the East, 1318–1913 (PDF). Peeters Publishers.
