= Qurt Tappeh, West Azerbaijan =

Qurt Tappeh قورت تپه
- Village
- Location within Iran
- Coordinates: 37°28′05″N 45°12′42″E
- Country: Iran
- Province: West Azerbaijan
- County: Urmia
- Bakhsh: Central
- Rural District: Torkaman

Population (2006)
  - Total: 316
- Time zone: UTC+3:30 (IRST)
  - Summer (DST): UTC+4:30 (IRDT)

Qurt Tappeh (Persian: قورت تپه, romanized: Qūrt Tappeh; Syriac: Qūrtāpāh) (Note: Also known as Kourtapa or Qūt Tappeh.) is a village in Torkaman Rural District, in the Central District of Urmia County, West Azerbaijan Province, Iran. At the 2006 census, its population was 316, in 85 families.

== History ==
In 1862, Qūrtāpāh was inhabited by 12 Church of the East Christian families who had no church or priest, according to the Russian archimandrite Sophoniah, at which time the village was served by the bishop Mār Gabriel of Ardishai. There were 20 Church of the East Christian families at Qūrtāpāh in 1877 with 1 church but no priest, as per Edward Lewes Cutts. The deacon Giwārgīs of Qūrtāpāh copied a manuscript at Sīre in 1895. The Church of Mār Giwārgīs at Qūrtāpāh is mentioned in the 1890s. Basil Nikitin recorded that the village was populated by Christians and Muslims just before the First World War. Prior to the First World War, there were 50 Assyrian houses at Qūrtāpāh, as per the list presented by Agha Petros to the Lausanne Peace Conference in 1922. It was located in the Baranduz District.

== Bibliography ==
- Gaunt, David (2006). Massacres, Resistance, Protectors: Muslim-Christian Relations in Eastern Anatolia during World War I. Gorgias Press.
- Wilmshurst, David (2000). The Ecclesiastical Organisation of the Church of the East, 1318–1913 (PDF). Peeters Publishers.
