= Saralan =

Saralan سارالان
- Village
- Location within Iran
- Coordinates: 37°26′24″N 45°09′06″E
- Country: Iran
- Province: West Azerbaijan
- County: Urmia
- Bakhsh: Central
- Rural District: Baranduzchay-ye Shomali

Population (2006)
  - Total: 319
- Time zone: UTC+3:30 (IRST)
  - Summer (DST): UTC+4:30 (IRDT)

Saralan (Persian: سارالان, romanized: Sārālān; also known as Sārān) is a village in Baranduzchay-ye Shomali Rural District, in the Central District of Urmia County, West Azerbaijan Province, Iran. As the 2006 census, its population was 319, with 89 families.

== History ==
In 1862, Sārālān was inhabited by 35 Church of the East Christian families, who did not have a priest or a church, according to the Russian archimandrite Sophoniah. Edward Lewes Cutts noted there were 35 Church of the East Christian families in 1877, with no priest or church. It was located in the Baranduz District. Basil Nikitin recorded that the village was populated by Christians and Muslims just before the First World War. Prior to the First World War, there were 100 Assyrian houses at Sārālān, as per the list presented by Agha Petros to the Lausanne Peace Conference in 1922.

== Bibliography ==
- Gaunt, David (2006). Massacres, Resistance, Protectors: Muslim-Christian Relations in Eastern Anatolia during World War I. Gorgias Press.
- Wilmshurst, David (2000). The Ecclesiastical Organisation of the Church of the East, 1318–1913 (PDF). Peeters Publishers.
