= Chamaki =

Chamaki چمكي
- Village
- Location within Iran
- Coordinates: 37°42′36″N 45°08′25″E
- Country: Iran
- Province: West Azerbaijan
- County: Urmia
- Bakhsh: Nazlu
- Rural District: Tala Tappeh
- Time zone: UTC+3:30 (IRST)
  - Summer (DST): UTC+4:30 (IRDT)

Chamaki (Persian: چمكي, romanized: Chamakī; Syriac: Chāmākī) (Note: Also known as Chammākīyé and Tchamakii.) is a village in Tala Tappeh Rural District, Nazlu District, Urmia County, West Azerbaijan Province, Iran. In the 1986 census, 33 people in 7 families were reported to live in Chamaki. At the 2006 census, its existence was noted, but its population was not reported.

== History ==
Chāmākī was inhabited by 50 Church of the East Christian families who were served by the Church of Mart Maryam and 2 priests in 1862, according to the Russian archimandrite Sophoniah. In 1877, there were 50 Church of the East Christian families with 1 priest and 1 church at Chāmākī, as per Edward Lewes Cutts. The scribe Joseph, son of the priest Tamraz, of Chāmākī restored a manuscript at Sopurghan in 1887. Basil Nikitin, the Russian consul at Urmia, noted that the village was entirely populated by Christians prior to the First World War. Prior to the First World War, there were 300 Assyrian houses at Chāmākī, as per the list presented by Agha Petros to the Lausanne Peace Conference in 1922. It was located in the Anzel District.

In 2020, the Church of Saint Mary at Chāmākī underwent restoration.

== Bibliography ==
- Al-Jeloo, Nicholas (2015). "Persian Christians: Assyrian art and architecture of Urmia as an example of regional cultural expression". Parole de l’Orient. 40: 13–27.
- Gaunt, David (2006). Massacres, Resistance, Protectors: Muslim-Christian Relations in Eastern Anatolia during World War I. Gorgias Press.
- Wilmshurst, David (2000). The Ecclesiastical Organisation of the Church of the East, 1318–1913 (PDF). Peeters Publishers.
