= Hesar-e Babaganjeh =

Hesar-e Babaganjeh حصارباباگنجه
- Village
- Location within Iran
- Coordinates: 37°43′00″N 45°04′00″E
- Country: Iran
- Province: West Azerbaijan
- County: Urmia
- Bakhsh: Nazlu
- Rural District: Nazlu-e Shomali

Population (2006)
  - Total: 72
- Time zone: UTC+3:30 (IRST)
  - Summer (DST): UTC+4:30 (IRDT)

Hesar-e Babaganjeh (Persian: حصارباباگنجه, romanized: Ḩeşār-e Bābāganjeh; Syriac: Haṣār d-Bābāganjā) (Note: Also known as Hassar Babagaga.) is a village in Nazlu-e Shomali Rural District, Nazlu District, Urmia County, West Azerbaijan Province, Iran. At the 2006 census, its population was 72, in 15 families.

== History ==
Haṣār d-Bābāganjā was inhabited by 4 Church of the East Christian families with no church or priest in 1877, as per Edward Lewes Cutts. Basil Nikitin, the Russian consul at Urmia, noted that the village was populated by Christians and Muslims just before the First World War. Prior to the First World War, there were 20 Assyrian houses at Haṣār d-Bābāganjā, as per the list presented by Agha Petros to the Lausanne Peace Conference in 1922. It was located in the Anzel District.

== Bibliography ==
- Gaunt, David (2006). Massacres, Resistance, Protectors: Muslim-Christian Relations in Eastern Anatolia during World War I. Gorgias Press.
- Wilmshurst, David (2000). The Ecclesiastical Organisation of the Church of the East, 1318–1913 (PDF). Peeters Publishers.
