= Burashan =

Burashan بوراشان
- Village
- Location within Iran
- Coordinates: 37°34′40″N 45°08′44″E
- Country: Iran
- Province: West Azerbaijan
- County: Urmia
- Bakhsh: Central
- Rural District: Bakeshluchay

Population (2006)
  - Total: 124
- Time zone: UTC+3:30 (IRST)
  - Summer (DST): UTC+4:30 (IRDT)

Burashan (Persian: بوراشان, romanized: Būrāshān; Turkish: Borāshān) (Note: Also known as Borachon.) is a village in Bakeshluchay Rural District, in the Central District of Urmia County, West Azerbaijan Province, Iran. At the 2006 census, its population was 124, in 35 families.

== History ==
In 1877, Būrāshān was inhabited by 14 Church of the East Christian families and did not have a church or a priest. It was located in the Baranduz district. Prior to the First World War, there were 50 Assyrian houses at Būrāshān, as per the list presented by Agha Petros to the Lausanne Peace Conference in 1922.

== Bibliography ==
- Gaunt, David (2006). Massacres, Resistance, Protectors: Muslim-Christian Relations in Eastern Anatolia during World War I. Gorgias Press.
- Wilmshurst, David (2000). The Ecclesiastical Organisation of the Church of the East, 1318–1913 (PDF). Peeters Publishers.
