= Alvach =

Alvach الواچ
- Village
- Location within Iran
- Coordinates: 37°34′05″N 45°01′16″E
- Country: Iran
- Province: West Azerbaijan
- County: Urmia
- Bakhsh: Central
- Rural District: Rowzeh Chay

Population (2006)
  - Total: 5,320
- Time zone: UTC+3:30 (IRST)
  - Summer (DST): UTC+4:30 (IRDT)

Alvach (Persian: الواچ, romanized: Alvāch; Syriac: Alwāj) (Note: Also known as Alwach, Alwatch, Alwatshe, and Alvāj.) is a village in Rowzeh Chay Rural District, in the Central District of Urmia County, West Azerbaijan Province, Iran. At the 2006 census, its population was 5,320, in 1,075 families. It is inhabited by Kurds.

== History ==
Alwāj was noted by Anglican missionaries in 1893. There were 92 Church of the East Christian families with 1 church in 1914 when visited by the priest Mirzā Benjamin Kaldāni. It was located in the Baranduz district. Prior to the First World War, there were 70 Assyrian houses at Alwāj, as per the list presented by Agha Petros to the Lausanne Peace Conference in 1922. In October 1914, amidst the Sayfo, after Russian forces had withdrawn to Urmia and the villagers had fled to the city, Turco-Kurdish troops set fire to Alwāj and killed those who had remained behind. Headstones in the former Christian graveyard in the village were still extant in 2008 albeit they had been damaged by Kurds who celebrated fire festivals in connection with Nowruz there.

== Bibliography ==
- Al-Jeloo, Nicholas (2010). "Evidence in Stone and Wood: The Assyrian/Syriac History and Heritage of the Urmia Region in Iran, as Reconstructed from Epigraphic Evidence". Parole de l’Orient. 35: 1–27.
- Gaunt, David (2006). Massacres, Resistance, Protectors: Muslim-Christian Relations in Eastern Anatolia during World War I. Gorgias Press.
- Wilmshurst, David (2000). The Ecclesiastical Organisation of the Church of the East, 1318–1913 (PDF). Peeters Publishers.
- Yacoub, Joseph (2016). Year of the Sword: The Assyrian Christian Genocide, A History. Translated by James Ferguson. Oxford University Press.
