= Vazirabad, West Azerbaijan =

Vazirabad وزيراباد
- Village
- Location within Iran
- Coordinates: 37°32′03″N 45°07′26″E
- Country: Iran
- Province: West Azerbaijan
- County: Urmia
- Bakhsh: Central
- Rural District: Bakeshluchay

Population (2006)
  - Total: 91
- Time zone: UTC+3:30 (IRST)
  - Summer (DST): UTC+4:30 (IRDT)

Vazirabad (Persian: وزيراباد}, romanized: Vazīrābād; Syriac: Wazirābād) (Note: Also known as Vazirawa and Wazīr-Ābād.) is a village in Bakeshluchay Rural District, in the Central District of Urmia County, West Azerbaijan Province, Iran. At the 2006 census its population was 91, in 28 families.

== History ==
In 1862, Wazirābād with Dīzā was inhabited by 50 Church of the East Christian families and was served by the Church of Mār Giwārgīs and 1 priest, according to the Russian archimandrite Sophoniah. There were 54 Church of the East Christian families at Wazirābād with 1 church and no priests in 1877, as per Edward Lewes Cutts. The priest Joseph of Wazirābād is mentioned in 1886 as having helped the American mission. The village was located in the Baranduz District. Prior to the First World War, there were 130 Assyrian houses at Wazirābād, as per the list presented by Agha Petros to the Lausanne Peace Conference in 1922.

== Bibliography ==
- Al-Jeloo, Nicholas (2015). "Persian Christians: Assyrian art and architecture of Urmia as an example of regional cultural expression". Parole de l’Orient. 40: 13–27.
- Gaunt, David (2006). Massacres, Resistance, Protectors: Muslim-Christian Relations in Eastern Anatolia during World War I. Gorgias Press.
- Wilmshurst, David (2000). The Ecclesiastical Organisation of the Church of the East, 1318–1913 (PDF). Peeters Publishers.
