= Alqian =

Alqian القيان
- Village
- Location within Iran
- Coordinates: 37°26′20″N 45°13′24″E
- Country: Iran
- Province: West Azerbaijan
- County: Urmia
- Bakhsh: Central
- Rural District: Torkaman

Population (2006)
  - Total: 197
- Time zone: UTC+3:30 (IRST)
  - Summer (DST): UTC+4:30 (IRDT)

Alqian (Persian: القيان, romanized: Alqīān; Syriac: Ālqāye) is a village in Torkaman Rural District, in the Central District of Urmia County, West Azerbaijan Province, Iran. At the 2006 census, its population was 197, in 48 families.

== History ==
A manuscript was copied at Ālqāye by the deacon Ḥnānīshōʿ of Shāpāṭ on 10 July 1594. The village was inhabited by 40 Church of the East Christian families who were served by the Church of Mār Addaï and 2 priests in 1862, according to the Russian archimandrite Sophoniah. In 1877, there were 32 Church of the East Christian families at Ālqāye with 2 churches and 2 priests, as per Edward Lewes Cutts. It was located in the Baranduz District.

== Bibliography ==
- Wilmshurst, David (2000). The Ecclesiastical Organisation of the Church of the East, 1318–1913 (PDF). Peeters Publishers.
