= Janizeh =

Janizeh جنيزه
- Village
- Location within Iran
- Coordinates: 37°39′58″N 44°57′42″E
- Country: Iran
- Province: West Azerbaijan
- County: Urmia
- Bakhsh: Nazlu
- Rural District: Nazluchay

Population (2006)
  - Total: 30
- Time zone: UTC+3:30 (IRST)
  - Summer (DST): UTC+4:30 (IRDT)

Janizeh (Persian: جنيزه, romanized: Janīzeh; Syriac: Jenīzā) is a village in Nazluchay Rural District, Nazlu District, Urmia County, West Azerbaijan Province, Iran. At the 2006 census, its population was 30, in 10 families.

== History ==
Jenīzā was inhabited by 20 Church of the East Christian families and was served by the Church of Mār Stephen and the Church of Mār Giwārgīs and 1 priest in 1862, according to the Russian archimandrite Sophoniah. It was located in the Anzel district. There were 26 Church of the East Christian families and 2 churches and 2 priests in 1877, as per Edward Lewes Cutts. Basil Nikitin, the Russian consul at Urmia, noted that Jenīzā was populated by Christians and Muslims just before the First World War.

== Bibliography ==
- Wilmshurst, David (2000). The Ecclesiastical Organisation of the Church of the East, 1318–1913 (PDF). Peeters Publishers.
