= Zonbalan, West Azerbaijan =

Zonbalan زنبلان
- Village
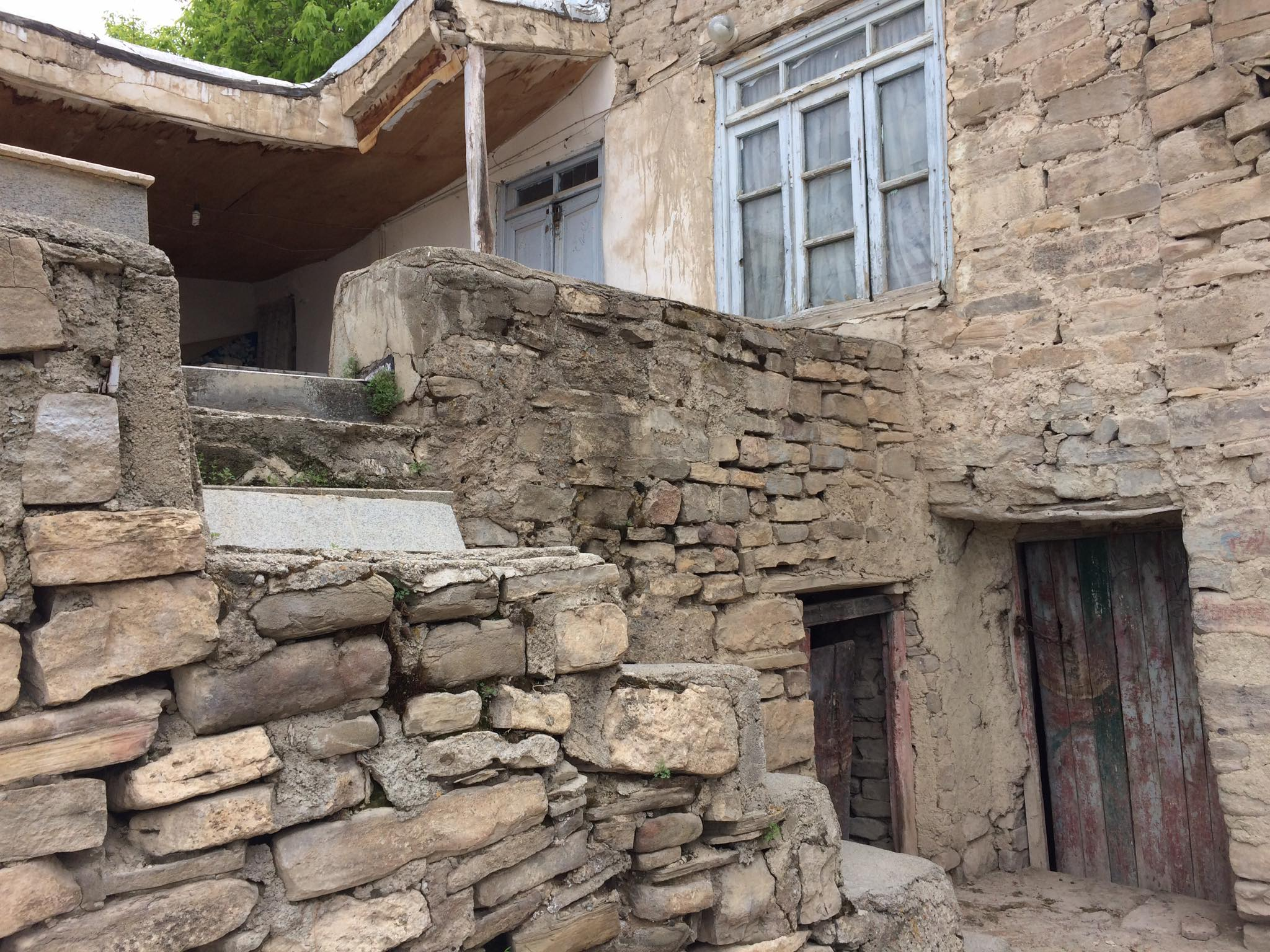
- Old Assyrian Christian house in Zonbalan

- Location within Iran
- Coordinates: 37°41′59″N 45°02′04″E
- Country: Iran
- Province: West Azerbaijan
- County: Urmia
- Bakhsh: Nazlu
- Rural District: Nazlu-e Shomali

Population (2006)
  - Total: 127
- Time zone: UTC+3:30 (IRST)
  - Summer (DST): UTC+4:30 (IRDT)

Zonbalan (Persian: زنبلان, romanized: Zonbalān; Syriac: Zūmalān) (Note: Also known as Zoumalan and Zombelān.) is a village in Nazlu-e Shomali Rural District, Nazlu District, Urmia County, West Azerbaijan province, Iran. At the 2006 census, its population was 127, in 37 families.

== History ==
Zūmalān was inhabited by 35 Church of the East Christian families and was served by the Church of Mart Maryam and 1 priest in 1862, according to the Russian archimandrite Sophoniah. There were 44 Church of the East Christian families with 1 church and 3 priests at Zūmalān in 1877, as per Edward Lewes Cutts. Basil Nikitin, the Russian consul at Urmia, recorded that the village was entirely populated by Christians just before the First World War. It was located in the Anzel district.

== Bibliography ==
- Hellot-Bellier, Florence (2017). "The Resistance of Urmia Assyrians to Violence at the Beginning of the Twentieth Century". In David Gaunt; Naures Atto; Soner O. Barthoma (eds.). Let Them Not Return: Sayfo – The Genocide against the Assyrian, Syriac and Chaldean Christians in the Ottoman Empire (PDF). pp. 70–99.
- Wilmshurst, David (2000). The Ecclesiastical Organisation of the Church of the East, 1318–1913 (PDF). Peeters Publishers.
