= Shirabad, West Azerbaijan =

Shirabad
- Village
- Location within Iran
- Coordinates: 37°45′09″N 45°09′00″E
- Country: Iran
- Province: West Azerbaijan
- County: Urmia
- Bakhsh: Nazlu
- Rural District: Nazlu-e Shomali

Population (2006)
  - Total: 143
- Time zone: UTC+3:30 (IRST)
  - Summer (DST): UTC+4:30 (IRDT)

Shirabad (Persian: شيراباد; Syriac: Shīrābād) (Note: Also known as Šīrābād and Shīr-Ābād.) is a village in Nazlu-e Shomali Rural District, Nazlu District, Urmia County, West Azerbaijan Province, Iran. At the 2006 census, its population was 143, in 40 families. The village has at least one Armenian church.

== History ==
In 1862, Shirabad was inhabited by 40 Church of the East families and was served by two priests and the Church of Mār Shallīṭā, according to the Russian archimandrite Sophoniah. There were 31 Church of the East families at the village with two priests and one functioning church by 1877, as per Edward Lewes Cutts. The village was entirely populated by Christians prior to the First World War, according to the list prepared by Basil Nikitin, the Russian consul at Urmia. It was located in the Anzel district.

== Bibliography ==
- Al-Jeloo, Nicholas (2015). "Persian Christians: Assyrian art and architecture of Urmia as an example of regional cultural expression". Parole de l’Orient. 40: 13–27.
- Amurian, Andre; Kasheff, Manouchehr (1986). "ARMENIANS OF MODERN IRAN". In Yarshater, Ehsan (ed.). Encyclopædia Iranica (Online ed.). Encyclopædia Iranica Foundation.
- Wilmshurst, David (2000). The Ecclesiastical Organisation of the Church of the East, 1318–1913 (PDF). Peeters Publishers.
