= Takah =

Takah may refer to:

- Taqah, Oman
- Takah, West Azerbaijan, Iran
