= Faqibeyglu =

Village in West Azerbaijan province, Iran

Faqibeyglu Persian: فقي بيگلو
- Village
- Location within Iran
- Coordinates: 37°39′32″N 45°01′26″E
- Country: Iran
- Province: West Azerbaijan
- County: Urmia
- District: Central
- Rural District: Nazluy-e Jonubi

Population (2016)
  - Total: 321
- Time zone: UTC+3:30 (IRST)

Faqibeyglu (Persian: فقي بيگلو, romanized: Faqībeyglū; Syriac: Pāqaibaiglū) is a village in Nazluy-e Jonubi Rural District of the Central District in Urmia County, West Azerbaijan province, Iran.

== History ==
Pāqaibaiglū (today called Faqibeyglu) with Hachnabat was inhabited by 30 Church of the East Christian families and did not have a church or a priest in 1862, according to the Russian archimandrite Sophoniah. At this time, Pāqaibaiglū was tended to by the priest Paul of Bālū. There were 15 Church of the East Christian families with no church or priest at Pāqaibaiglū in 1877, as per Edward Lewes Cutts. It was located in the Anzel district.

== Demographics ==
=== Population ===
At the time of the 2006 National Census, the village's population was 275 in 55 households. The following census in 2011 counted 306 people in 72 households. The 2016 census measured the population of the village as 321 people in 75 households.

== Bibliography ==
- Wilmshurst, David (2000). The Ecclesiastical Organisation of the Church of the East, 1318–1913 (PDF). Peeters Publishers.
