= Armudaghaj =

Armudaghaj ارموداغاج
- Village
- Location within Iran
- Coordinates: 37°40′02″N 44°59′02″E
- Country: Iran
- Province: West Azerbaijan
- County: Urmia
- Bakhsh: Nazlu
- Rural District: Nazluchay

Population (2006)
  - Total: 72
- Time zone: UTC+3:30 (IRST)
  - Summer (DST): UTC+4:30 (IRDT)

Armudaghaj (Persian: ارموداغاج, romanized: Ārmūdāghāj; Syriac: ʿArmūṭāghāj) (Note: Also known as Armoudaqadj and Armud-Aghaj.) is a village in Nazluchay Rural District, Nazlu District, Urmia County, West Azerbaijan Province, Iran. At the 2006 census, its population was 72, in 24 families.

== History ==
A Church of the East bishop named Abraham resided at ʿArmūṭāghāj until his death prior to 1854; he is tentatively identified with the bishop of the same name mentioned in colophons of 1813, 1824, 1832, and 1836 which note that he died in 1833 and that his diocese included ʿArmūṭāghāj and some of the villages in the Tergawar district. ʿArmūṭāghāj was inhabited by 35 Church of the East Christian families and was served by the Church of Mār Gawrā and 1 priest in 1862, according to the Russian archimandrite Sophoniah, at which time it was part of the diocese of Anzel. There were 33 Church of the East Christian families with 1 priest and 1 church in 1877, as per Edward Lewes Cutts. It was located in the Anzel district. Basil Nikitin, the Russian consul at Urmia, noted that ʿArmūṭāghāj was populated by Christians and Muslims just before the First World War.

== Bibliography ==
- Al-Jeloo, Nicholas (2010). "Evidence in Stone and Wood: The Assyrian/Syriac History and Heritage of the Urmia Region in Iran, as Reconstructed from Epigraphic Evidence". Parole de l’Orient. 35: 1–27.
- Hellot-Bellier, Florence (2017). "The Resistance of Urmia Assyrians to Violence at the Beginning of the Twentieth Century". In David Gaunt; Naures Atto; Soner O. Barthoma (eds.). Let Them Not Return: Sayfo – The Genocide against the Assyrian, Syriac and Chaldean Christians in the Ottoman Empire (PDF). pp. 70–99.
- Wilmshurst, David (2000). The Ecclesiastical Organisation of the Church of the East, 1318–1913 (PDF). Peeters Publishers.
