= Badelbu =

Badelbu بدلبو
- Village
- Location within Iran
- Coordinates: 37°40′00″N 45°00′07″E
- Country: Iran
- Province: West Azerbaijan
- County: Urmia
- Bakhsh: Nazlu
- Rural District: Nazluchay

Population (2006)
  - Total: 328
- Time zone: UTC+3:30 (IRST)
  - Summer (DST): UTC+4:30 (IRDT)

Badelbu (Persian: بدلبو, romanized: Badelbū; Syriac: Bādilbū) (Note: Also known as Badilbou.) is a village in Nazluchay Rural District, Nazlu District, Urmia County, West Azerbaijan Province, Iran. At the 2006 census, its population was 328, in 74 families.

== History ==
Bādilbū was inhabited by 5 Church of the East Christian families and had 1 priest but did not have a church in 1862, according to the Russian archimandrite Sophoniah. There were 5 Church of the East Christian families with no church or priest at Bādilbū in 1877, as per Edward Lewes Cutts. Basil Nikitin, the Russian consul at Urmia, recorded that the village was populated by Christians and Muslims just before the First World War. It was located in the Anzel district.

== Bibliography ==
- Hellot-Bellier, Florence (2017). "The Resistance of Urmia Assyrians to Violence at the Beginning of the Twentieth Century". In David Gaunt; Naures Atto; Soner O. Barthoma (eds.). Let Them Not Return: Sayfo – The Genocide against the Assyrian, Syriac and Chaldean Christians in the Ottoman Empire (PDF). pp. 70–99.
- Wilmshurst, David (2000). The Ecclesiastical Organisation of the Church of the East, 1318–1913 (PDF). Peeters Publishers.
