= Takyeh, West Azerbaijan =

Takyeh تكه
- Village
- Location within Iran
- Coordinates: 37°27′22″N 45°15′21″E
- Country: Iran
- Province: West Azerbaijan
- County: Urmia
- Bakhsh: Central
- Rural District: Torkaman

Population (2006)
  - Total: 101
- Time zone: UTC+3:30 (IRST)
  - Summer (DST): UTC+4:30 (IRDT)

Takyeh (Persian: تكه; Syriac: Takā) (Note: Also known as Takah, Takka, Takoi, and Takkyā.) is a village in Torkaman Rural District, in the Central District of Urmia County, West Azerbaijan Province, Iran. At the 2006 census, its population was 101, in 30 families.

== History ==
The priest-scribe Īshō‘ copied a manuscript at Takā in 1778 and 1785. The Church of St Savr-Īsho‘ at Takā was constructed in the 19th century. In 1862, the village was populated by 31 Church of the East Christian families and was served by the Church of Mār Sabrīshō‘ with no priest, according to the Russian archimandrite Sophoniah. There were 90 Church of the East Christian families at Takā with 3 priests and 2 churches in 1877 as per Edward Lewes Cutts. There were 150 Chaldean Catholics at Takā in 1913 with 1 priest and no church as part of the Chaldean Catholic Archeparchy of Urmia. Basil Nikitin recorded that the village was populated by Christians and Muslims just before the First World War. It was located in the Baranduz District. Prior to the First World War, there were 300 Assyrian houses at Takā, as per the list presented by Agha Petros to the Lausanne Peace Conference in 1922.

== Bibliography ==
- Al-Jeloo, Nicholas (2015). "Persian Christians: Assyrian art and architecture of Urmia as an example of regional cultural expression". Parole de l’Orient. 40: 13–27.
- Gaunt, David (2006). Massacres, Resistance, Protectors: Muslim-Christian Relations in Eastern Anatolia during World War I. Gorgias Press.
- Wilmshurst, David (2000). The Ecclesiastical Organisation of the Church of the East, 1318–1913 (PDF). Peeters Publishers.
