= Nivlu =

Nivlu نيولو
- Village
- Location within Iran
- Coordinates: 37°23′41″N 45°07′13″E
- Country: Iran
- Province: West Azerbaijan
- County: Urmia
- Bakhsh: Central
- Rural District: Baranduzchay-ye Jonubi

Population (2006)
  - Total: 213
- Time zone: UTC+3:30 (IRST)
  - Summer (DST): UTC+4:30 (IRDT)

Nivlu (Persian: نيولو, also Romanized as Nīvlū; also known as Nīvlar) is a village in Baranduzchay-ye Jonubi Rural District, in the Central District of Urmia County, West Azerbaijan Province, Iran. At the 2006 census, its population was 213, in 61 families.
