= Ashurbanipal Babilla =

Iranian-Assyrian actor

- Born: June 25, 1944; Tehran, Iran
- Died: March 30, 2011 (aged 66); New York City, United States
- Occupations: Actor, theatre director, playwright, visual artist

Ashurbanipal Ebrahim Babilla (Note: Also "Ashur Banipal", "Assurbanipal", "Banipal Babilla") (June 25, 1944 – March 30, 2011) was an Assyrian-Iranian actor, theatre director, playwright and visual artist. Babilla's oeuvre received both critical acclaim as well as criticism. He wrote numerous plays in Persian and English. As a result of the Islamic Revolution, Babilla was forced to flee his native Iran and moved to the United States. In 2005, alongside four other Iranian writers, he received the Hellman-Hammett Award by Human Rights Watch.

== Biography ==
Ashurbanipal Babilla, known as "Bani" to his friends and relatives, was born to Shedrach and Luba Babilla (née Tamraz) in Tehran. His family were Presbyterian Assyrians. Babilla completed his primary and secondary education at the Mehr and Firuz Bahram schools in Tehran, and moved to Beirut afterwards to pursue further education. In 1968 he received his B.A. from the American University of Beirut and in 1971 his M.A. from the Near East School of Theology.

In Beirut, Babilla wrote several plays before returning to Iran in 1972. When he returned to Iran, Babilla at first planned to become a Presbyterian minister. However, according to Khosrow Shayesteh / Encyclopædia Iranica, due to his "radical belief in liberation theology", Babilla was reportedly de facto ousted from the Presbyterian Church by its elders. In 1972–1973, Babilla taught English literature at the Faculty of Literature and Foreign Languages of the University of Tehran. During his time as a teacher, Babilla directed several English plays, which were "produced by the International Theater of Tehran".

Babilla became renowned among Iranian avant-garde artists as a result of the plays he directed. In 1973, he became a member of the Kargah-e Namayesh (Theater Workshop). From 1973 to 1979, Babilla wrote numerous plays in Persian. He also created visual arts. Similar to the works he wrote, Babilla's paintings were deemed controversial. However, the posters Babilla created for his plays were a considered to be success and were named as "among the most progressive theatrical posters in the history of poster in Iran".

In December 1980, as a consequence of the Islamic Revolution, Babilla was forced to flee his native Iran "after almost a year of hiding". He eventually arrived in California, where he directed several plays and taught at University of Southern California. According to Khosrow Shayesteh, a year later, he left California for New York where he lived until his death. In New York, he contributed to the foundation of a "theater troupe", translated plays into Persian, and created "many paintings and sculptures", amongst others. In 1981, Babilla briefly taught at New York University, and from 1989 to 1996 at Bard College.

In an interview, Babilla stated that: "basically, there are three themes in all my work—sex, politics, and religion—and all are inseparable".

== Sources ==
- Shayesteh, Khosro (2013). "BABILLA, ASHUR BANIPAL IBRAHIM". In Yarshater, Ehsan (ed.). Encyclopædia Iranica (Online ed.). Encyclopædia Iranica Foundation.
