= Qarajalu, Urmia =

Qarajalu قراجلو
- village
- Location within Iran
- Coordinates: 37°32′27″N 45°13′32″E
- Country: Iran
- Province: West Azerbaijan
- County: Urmia
- Bakhsh: Central
- Rural District: Bakeshluchay

Population (2006)
  - Total: 72
- Time zone: UTC+3:30 (IRST)
  - Summer (DST): UTC+4:30 (IRDT)

Qarajalu (Persian: قراجلو, also Romanized as Qarājalū; also known as Qarah Jahlū) is a village in Bakeshluchay Rural District, in the Central District of Urmia County, West Azerbaijan Province, Iran. At the 2006 census, its population was 72, in 17 families.
