= Assyrian Pentecostal Church, Kermanshah =

Assyrian Pentecostal Church
- Assyrian Church of Kermanshah
- کلیسای پنطی کاستی
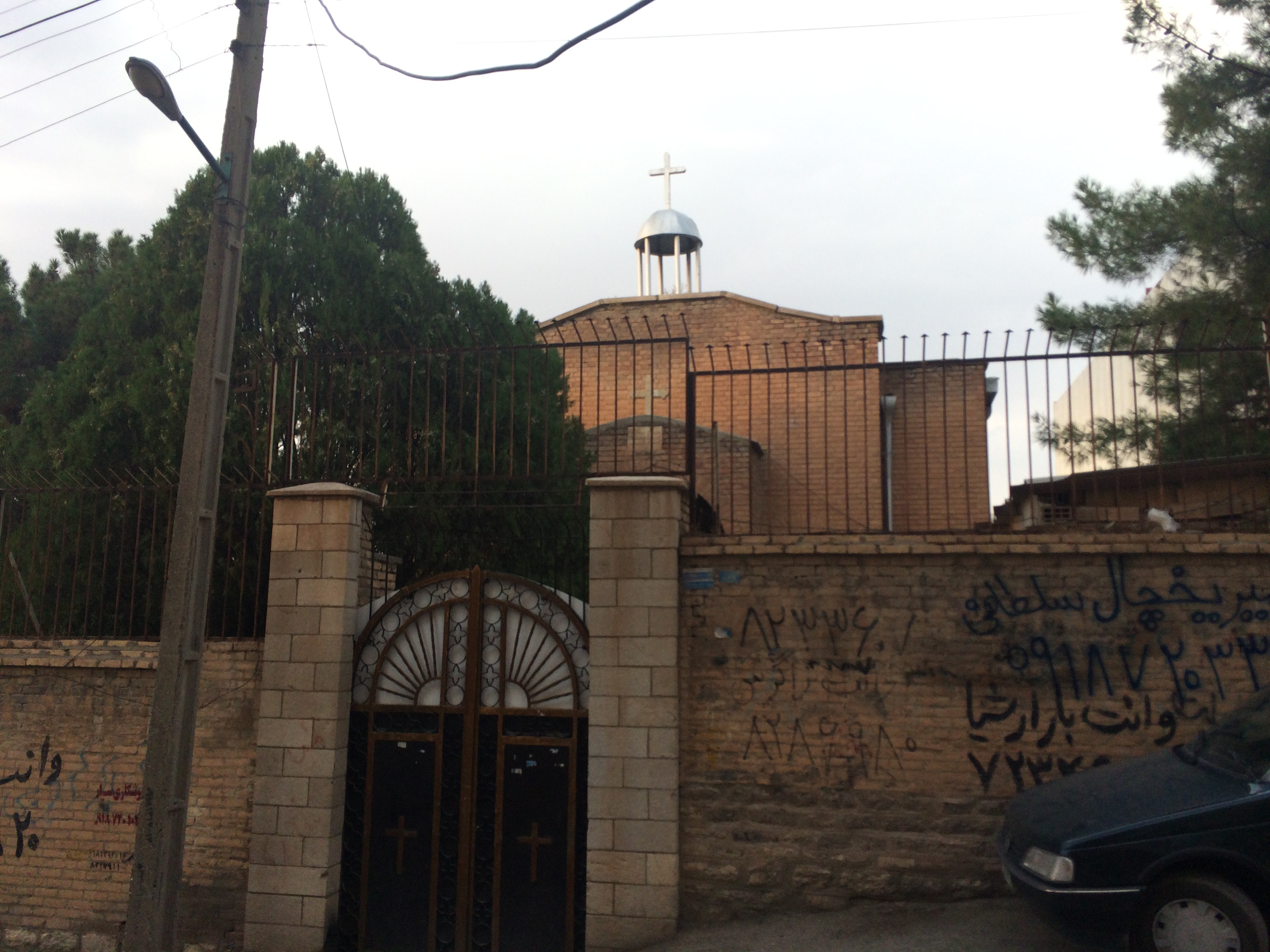
- Assyrian Pentecostal Church
- 34°18′21″N 47°03′51″E
- Location: Kermanshah
- Country: Iran

History
- Consecrated: 1955
- Events: stopped since 2010

Architecture
- Style: Assyrian

The Assyrian Pentecostal Church is an Assyrian Pentecostal Church in the city of Kermanshah in Iran.
