= Aliabad-e Baran Duz =

Village in West Azerbaijan, Iran

Aliabad-e Baran Duz علي ابادباراندوز
- Village
- Location within Iran
- Coordinates: 37°24′55″N 45°07′33″E
- Country: Iran
- Province: West Azerbaijan
- County: Urmia
- Bakhsh: Central
- Rural District: Baranduz

Population (2006)
  - Total: 341
- Time zone: UTC+3:30 (IRST)
  - Summer (DST): UTC+4:30 (IRDT)

Aliabad-e Baran Duz (Persian: علي ابادباراندوز, also Romanized as ‘Alīābād-e Bārān Dūz; also known as ‘Alīābād) is a village in Baranduz Rural District, in the Central District of Urmia County, West Azerbaijan Province, Iran. At the 2006 census, its population was 341, in 87 families.
