= Da'tid Bahrana =

Iranian Assyrian periodical

Da'tid Bahrana (with the Persian title Ayande-ye rowshan, lit. "Bright future") was an Assyrian bilingual (Assyrian Neo-Aramaic and Persian) periodical published in Tehran, Iran in 1951. Extant copies are few. One issue is located at Harvard College Library. A full set is possibly stored at the Majles library in Tehran.

== Sources ==
- Eden, Naby (2010). "Da'tid Bahrana". In Yarshater, Ehsan (ed.). Encyclopædia Iranica (Online ed.). Encyclopædia Iranica Foundation.
