= Tazeh Kand-e Jamalkhan =

Tazeh Kand-e Jamalkhan تازه كندجمال خان
- Village
- Location within Iran
- Coordinates: 37°24′00″N 45°06′08″E
- Country: Iran
- Province: West Azerbaijan
- County: Urmia
- Bakhsh: Central
- Rural District: Baranduzchay-ye Jonubi

Population (2006)
  - Total: 37
- Time zone: UTC+3:30 (IRST)
  - Summer (DST): UTC+4:30 (IRDT)

Tazeh Kand-e Jamalkhan (Persian: تازه كندجمال خان, also Romanized as Tāzeh Kand-e Jamālkhān; also known as Tāzeh Kand; in Armenian: Թազագիւղ) is a village in Baranduzchay-ye Jonubi Rural District, in the Central District of Urmia County, West Azerbaijan Province, Iran. At the 2006 census, its population was 37, in 10 families.
