= Haki, Iran =

Village in West Azerbaijan province, Iran

Haki Persian: حكي
- Village
- Location within Iran
- Coordinates: 37°34′18″N 44°44′36″E
- Country: Iran
- Province: West Azerbaijan
- County: Urmia
- District: Silvaneh
- Rural District: Targavar

Population (2016)
  - Total: 611
- Time zone: UTC+3:30 (IRST)

Haki (Persian: حكي, romanized: Ḩakī) (Note: Also known as Hakki.) is a village in Targavar Rural District of Silvaneh District in Urmia County, West Azerbaijan province, Iran.

== History ==
Haki was inhabited by 20 Church of the East Christian families with 1 church in 1877, as per Edward Lewes Cutts. It was located in the Tergāwār district.

== Demographics ==
=== Population ===
At the time of the 2006 National Census, the village's population was 622 in 104 households. The following census in 2011 counted 604 people in 134 households. The 2016 census measured the population of the village as 611 people in 130 households.

== Bibliography ==
- Hellot-Bellier, Florence (2017). "The Resistance of Urmia Assyrians to Violence at the Beginning of the Twentieth Century". In David Gaunt; Naures Atto; Soner O. Barthoma (eds.). Let Them Not Return: Sayfo – The Genocide against the Assyrian, Syriac and Chaldean Christians in the Ottoman Empire (PDF). pp. 70–99.
- Wilmshurst, David (2000). The Ecclesiastical Organisation of the Church of the East, 1318–1913 (PDF). Peeters Publishers.
