= Assyrian Evangelical Church =

Presbyterian church in the Middle East

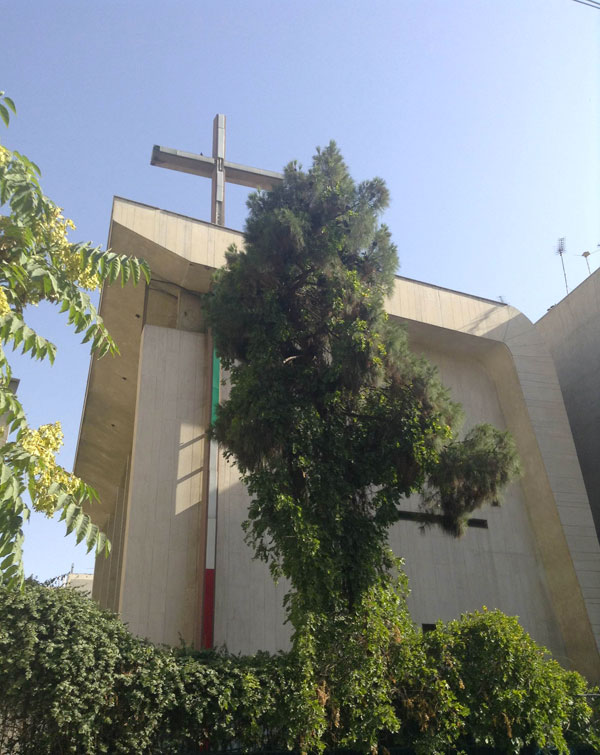
- St. Thomas Evangelical Church in Tehran, Iran.
- Type: Eastern Reformed Christian
- Classification: Protestant
- Orientation: Presbyterian Reformed
- Region: Australia, Canada, United States, Iran, Iraq, Turkey, Syria
- Origin: 1870

The Assyrian Evangelical Church is a Presbyterian church in the Middle East that attained a status of ecclesiastical independence from the Presbyterian mission in Iran in 1870.

== Members ==
Its members are predominantly ethnic Assyrians, an Eastern Aramaic speaking Semitic people who are indigenous to Upper Mesopotamia (what had been Assyria between the 25th century BCE and 7th century CE), and descendants of the ancient Assyrians. (see Assyria, Assyrian continuity and Assyrian people).

Most Assyrian Evangelicals (as well as members of the Assyrian Pentecostal Church), before conversion to Protestantism, had initially been members of the Assyrian Church of the East; its later 18th century offshoot, the Chaldean Catholic Church; or the Syriac Orthodox Church. The vast majority of ethnic Assyrians remain adherents of these ancient Eastern Rite churches to this day.

== Statement of faith ==
Here is a list of the core beliefs of the Assyrian Evangelical Church:

- The mission of Assyrian Evangelical Church is the same as what Jesus gave his followers: "Go therefore and make disciples of all nations, baptizing them in the name of the Father and of the Son and of the Holy Spirit." (Matthew 28:18-20)
- The Assyrian Evangelical Church believes that Godhead eternally exists in three persons: God the father, God the son, and God the Holy Spirit.
- Jesus Christ was conceived by the Holy Spirit, born of virgin Mary, and received a human body; Though He retained His absolute deity, at the same time being truly God and truly man.
- Belief in the deity and personality of the Holy Spirit, who dwells in every believer and enables them to live a holy life and do the work of the Lord through His guidance.
- The Bible is the inerrant and infallible word of God, written through the inspiration of the Holy Spirit. That it was inspired in the sense that holy men of God “were moved by the Holy Spirit” to write the words of Scriptures.
- Man was created in the image of God; that he sinned and thereby incurred not only physical death but also spiritual death, which is separation from God; and that all human beings are born with a sinful nature.
- Jesus Christ died for the sins of mankind as a substitutionary sacrifice and that whoever believes in Him is justified on the ground of His shed blood. Salvation is by grace through faith only and is the gift of God.
- The Church is meant to be the visible body of Christ, sent into the world to glorify God and proclaim the gospel of Jesus Christ.
- Belief in the imminent return of Jesus Christ to judge the living and the dead.
- Belief in the bodily resurrection of the dead; and of the unbeliever to judgment and everlasting punishment. Also, belief in the real existence of Satan.
- The body of the church is composed of all those who personally receive Jesus Christ as their Savior and Lord.

== Locations ==
There are several Assyrian Evangelical churches in the diaspora, e.g. in San Jose, Sydney, Melbourne, Turlock, and Chicago. There are also a few in Lebanon and as well as in Jordan, although Arabic services are more common in these countries.

== Language ==
The liturgical language spoken by the members, church choir, and the pastors is Suret, a language descended from the Mesopotamian Aramaic introduced into the Assyrian Empire during the 8th century BC. Prayers and scripture are read and recited from a Syriac Aramaic Bible.

== Incidents ==
In 2010, Iranian Assyrian pastor Wilson Issavi was arrested in Kermanshah and detained for 54 days for allegedly attempting to convert Muslims to Christianity. Whilst in prison, Issavi was allegedly tortured as he had bruises and marks from beatings on his body.

== Gallery ==
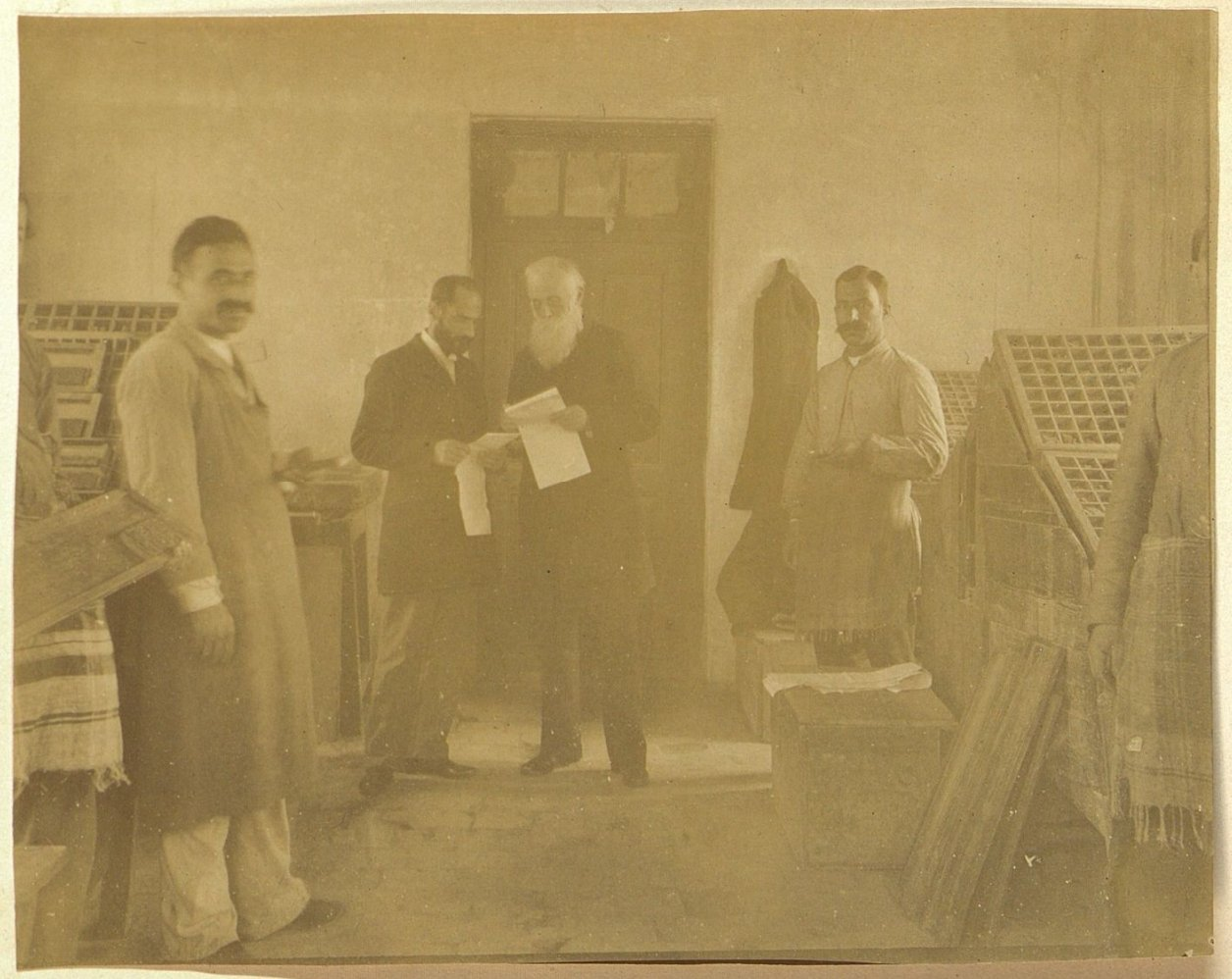
Local printers in their workshop, from the Presbyterian Assyrian community in Urmia, 1900

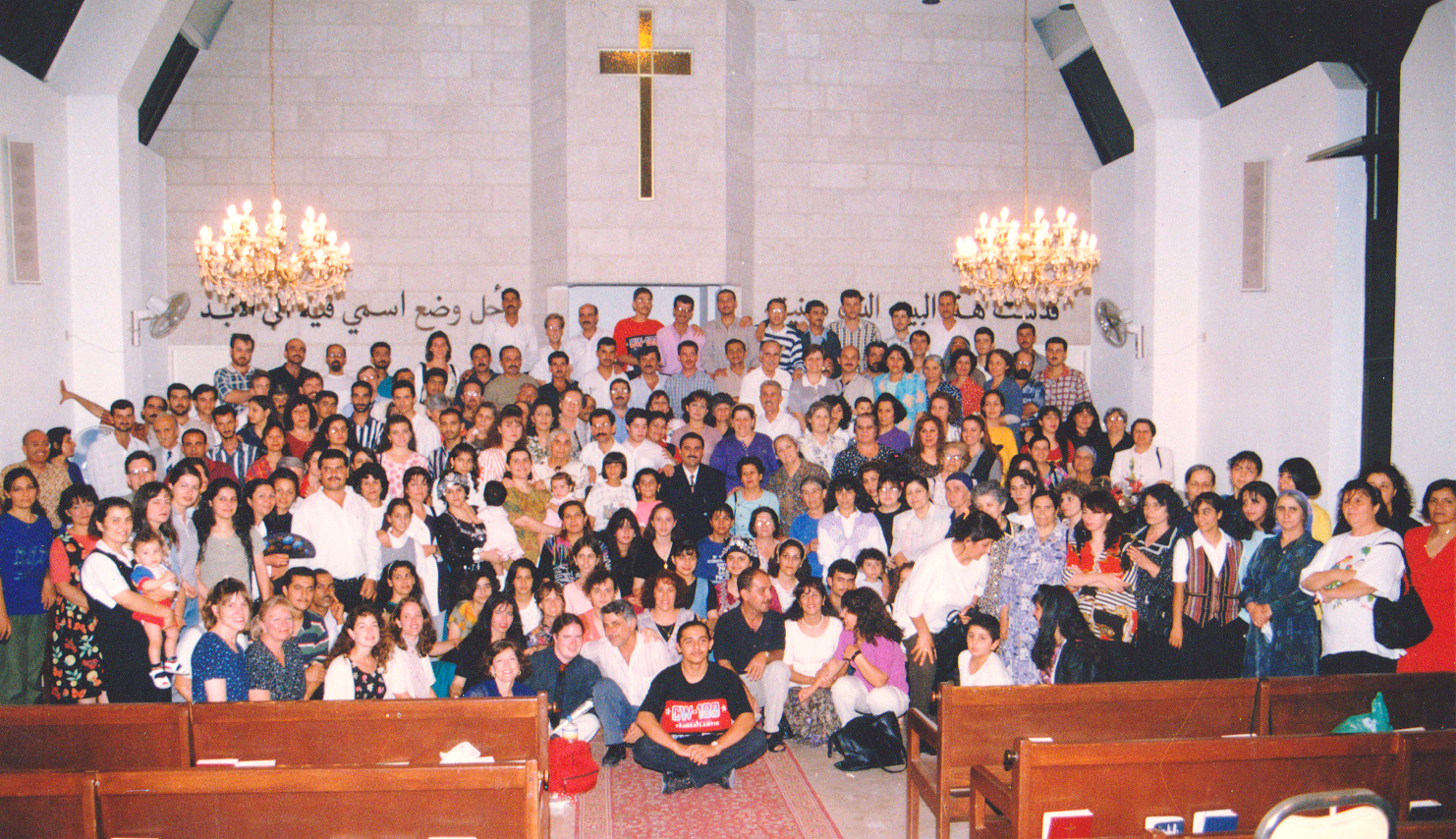
Iraqi Assyrians in an evangelical alliance church, Amman, 1998.

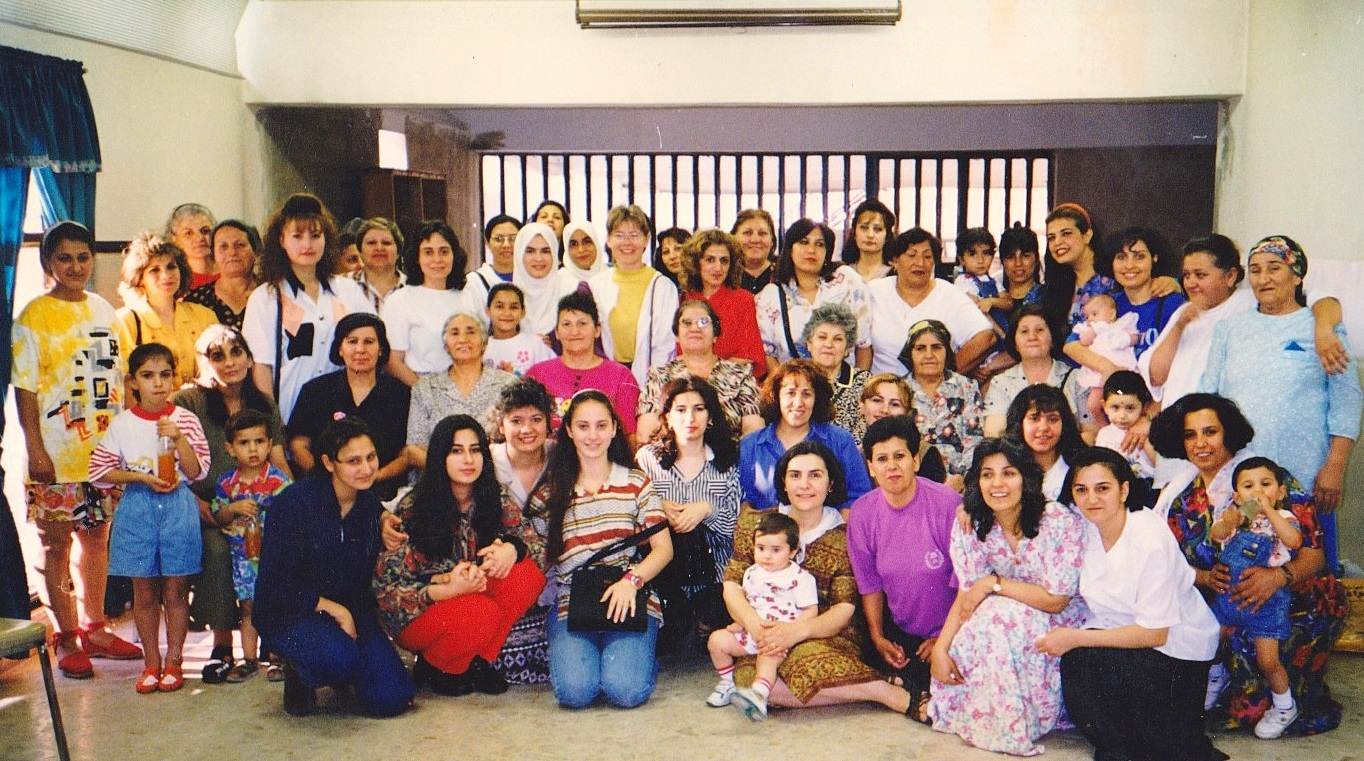
Iraqi Assyrians, a few Jordanian Arab converts and Anglo-American missionaries at an Assyrian Evangelical hall, 1999.

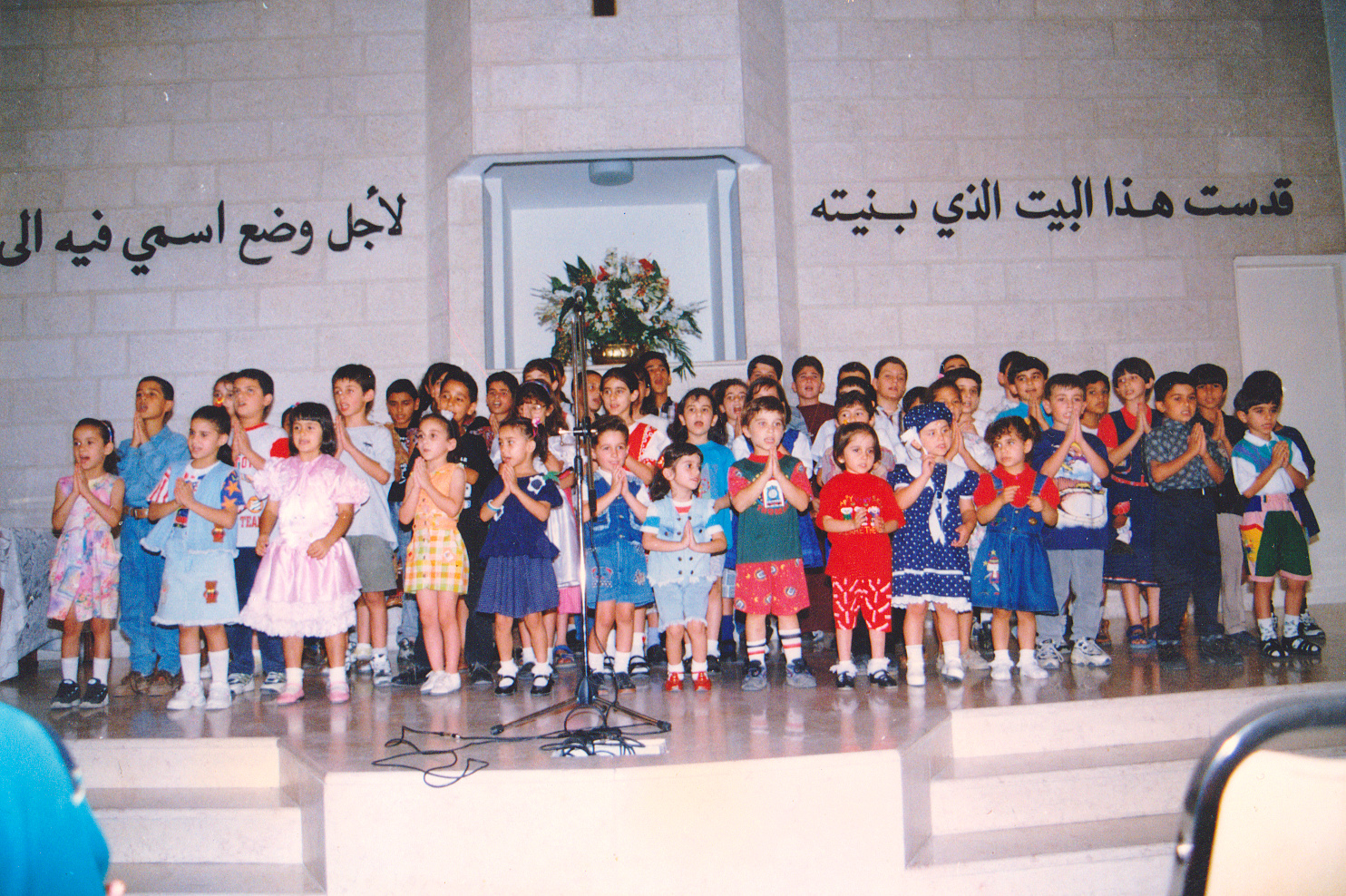
Assyrian children participating in a choir at an Evangelical church in Amman, 1998.
