= Surbani =

Surbani سورباني
- Village
- Location within Iran
- Coordinates: 37°38′11″N 44°40′50″E
- Country: Iran
- Province: West Azerbaijan
- County: Urmia
- Bakhsh: Silvaneh
- Rural District: Targavar

Population (2006)
  - Total: 45
- Time zone: UTC+3:30 (IRST)
  - Summer (DST): UTC+4:30 (IRDT)

Surbani (Persian: سورباني, also Romanized as Sūrbānī; also known as Sūrbān and Sūrehbān) is a village in Targavar Rural District, Silvaneh District, Urmia County, West Azerbaijan Province, Iran. At the 2006 census, its population was 45, in 6 families.
