= Ali Kan =

Ali Kan علي كان
- Village
- Location within Iran
- Coordinates: 38°00′09″N 44°55′48″E
- Country: Iran
- Province: West Azerbaijan
- County: Urmia
- Bakhsh: Anzal
- Rural District: Anzal-e Jonubi

Population (2006)
  - Total: 596
- Time zone: UTC+3:30 (IRST)
  - Summer (DST): UTC+4:30 (IRDT)

Ali Kan (Persian: علي كان, also Romanized as ‘Alī Kān and ‘Alīkān) is a village in Anzal-e Jonubi Rural District, Anzal District, Urmia County, West Azerbaijan Province, Iran. At the 2006 census, its population was 596, in 132 families.
