= Razgeh, West Azerbaijan =

Razgeh رزگه
- Village
- Location within Iran
- Coordinates: 37°19′56″N 44°53′08″E
- Country: Iran
- Province: West Azerbaijan
- County: Urmia
- Bakhsh: Silvaneh
- Rural District: Margavar

Population (2006)
  - Total: 512
- Time zone: UTC+3:30 (IRST)
  - Summer (DST): UTC+4:30 (IRDT)

Razgeh (Persian: رزگه; Syriac: Razgā) (Note: Also known as Razangeh.) is a village in Margavar Rural District, Silvaneh District, Urmia County, West Azerbaijan Province, Iran. At the 2006 census, its population was 512, in 92 families.

== History ==
A manuscript was copied at the Church of Mār Quriāqōs at Razgā in 1601 by the priest Joseph, son of the priest Hormizd, son of Dirbīz, son of Niyazār, of Shāpāṭ (Shemsdīn) for the pilgrim Darwīsh of the tribe of the Behtimnāye who gave it to the Church of Mart Shmūni at Rustāqā. The scribe Shlemūn of Darband copied a manuscript for Ezekiel, son of Isaac, of Razgā in 1728. It was located in the Tergāwār district.

== Bibliography ==
- Wilmshurst, David (2000). The Ecclesiastical Organisation of the Church of the East, 1318–1913 (PDF). Peeters Publishers.
