= Tazeh Kand-e Janizeh =

Tazeh Kand-e Janizeh تازه كندجنيزه
- Village
- Location within Iran
- Coordinates: 37°39′50″N 44°58′13″E
- Country: Iran
- Province: West Azerbaijan
- County: Urmia
- Bakhsh: Nazlu
- Rural District: Nazluchay

Population (2006)
  - Total: 234
- Time zone: UTC+3:30 (IRST)
  - Summer (DST): UTC+4:30 (IRDT)

Tazeh Kand-e Janizeh (Persian: تازه كندجنيزه, also Romanized as Tāzeh Kand-e Janīzeh) is a village in Nazluchay Rural District, Nazlu District, Urmia County, West Azerbaijan Province, Iran. At the 2006 census, its population was 234, in 62 families.
