= Chaman, West Azerbaijan =

Chaman چمان
- Village
- Location within Iran
- Coordinates: 37°29′28″N 44°46′48″E
- Country: Iran
- Province: West Azerbaijan
- County: Urmia
- Bakhsh: Silvaneh
- Rural District: Dasht

Population (2006)
  - Total: 70
- Time zone: UTC+3:30 (IRST)
  - Summer (DST): UTC+4:30 (IRDT)

Chaman (Persian: چمان, also Romanized as Chamān) is a village in Dasht Rural District, Silvaneh District, Urmia County, West Azerbaijan Province, Iran. At the 2006 census, its population was 70, in 13 families.
