= Tazeh Kand-e Sheshmal =

Tazeh Kand-e Sheshmal تازه كندشش مال
- Village
- Location within Iran
- Coordinates: 37°44′00″N 44°50′23″E
- Country: Iran
- Province: West Azerbaijan
- County: Urmia
- Bakhsh: Sumay-ye Beradust
- Rural District: Beradust

Population (2006)
  - Total: 50
- Time zone: UTC+3:30 (IRST)
  - Summer (DST): UTC+4:30 (IRDT)

Tazeh Kand-e Sheshmal (Persian: تازه كندشش مال, also Romanized as Tāzh Kand-e Sheshmāl; also known as Tāzeh Kand and Tāzeh Kand-e Past) is a village in Beradust Rural District, Sumay-ye Beradust District, Urmia County, West Azerbaijan Province, Iran. At the 2006 census, its population was 50, in 10 families.
