= Assyrian Pentecostal Church =

Christian denomination

- Type: Eastern Reformed Christian
- Classification: Protestant
- Orientation: Pentecostal
- Distinct fellowships: World Assemblies of God Fellowship
- Region: Australia, Canada, United States, Iran, Iraq, Turkey, Syria
- Members: 15,000-20,000

The Assyrian Pentecostal Church (Syriac: ܥܕܬܐ ܕܐܚܘܢܘ̈ܬܐ ܦܢܛܩܘܣܛܝ̈ܐ ܐܬܘܪ̈ܝܐ, romanized: ‘Ittā d-Akhonāwāthā Pēnṭēqosṭāyē Ātūrāyē; Persian: کلیسای پنطیکاستی آشوری), is a Reformed Eastern Christian denomination that began in ethnically Assyrian villages across the Urmia region in northwestern Iran, spreading to the Assyrians living in the adjacent cities, and from there to indigenous Assyrian communities in the Assyrian Homeland, northern Iraq, southeastern Turkey and northeastern Syria.

The indigenous Assyrian people of ancient Assyria and Upper Mesopotamia had adopted Christianity in the 1st century AD, founding the Church of the East in Assyria and Osroene (see also: Assyria, Assyrian people and Assyrian continuity). Those who converted to the Pentecostal Church (as well as the Assyrian Evangelical Church) in the 20th century were initially all members of the Assyrian Church of the East or its later 18th century AD offshoot, the Chaldean Catholic Church, whilst others had been members of the Syriac Orthodox Church or Ancient Church of the East (a 20th-century offshoot of the Assyrian Church). The vast majority of modern-day ethnic Assyrians remain adherents of these ancient indigenous Eastern Rite churches.

The current church's doctrine and tradition is a continuation of the spiritual revival movements that took place in Western Iran during the 1930s. In 1940, with great diligence and personal sacrifice a young Assyrian pastor, named Tooma Nasseri began his evangelical ministry throughout Western Iran and built churches and established congregations in villages, towns, and major metropolitan cities in Iran. With the seed of Protestant Christianity planted, the Assyrian Protestant churches began to emerge throughout greater Iran in the 1950s. Currently, the Assyrian Pentecostal Church has several congregations in California, Illinois, Canada, Australia, Austria, and Iran. The Church is an affiliate with the Assemblies of God. Today, the church may have from 12 to 20 thousand adherents.

== Name of the church ==
The term Pentecostal is derived from Pentecost, or the Jewish Feast of Weeks, which commemorates the descent of the Holy Spirit upon the followers of Jesus Christ (Esho Mshexa in Assyrian Neo-Aramaic) as described in the Book of Acts, Chapter 2. Thus, the Church's name originates from the biblical passages contained within the Acts of the Apostles which refers to the day of Pentecost.

== Statement of beliefs ==
- The scriptures:

The Bible is the inspired Word of God. (2 Timothy 3:16)

- The God Head:

Our God is one, but manifested in three persons, The Father, the Son and the Holy Spirit. (John 16: 13-15)

- Man, His Fall and Redemption:

Through Adam's transgression and fall, sin came into the world. (Romans 5:12-21)

- The New Birth:

Through Jesus' death and resurrection, righteousness comes to all who believe. (John 3:3-5)

- Water Baptism:

Baptism in water, by immersion. (Matthew 28:16)

- Baptism in the Holy Ghost:

The baptism in the Holy Ghost and fire is a gift from God. (Matthew 3:11, Acts 1:8, Acts 2: 1-4)

- Divine Healing:

It is provided in the atonement of Christ and is the privilege of every member of the church today. (James 5: 14-15, Mark 16:18, Isaiah 53:4, Matthew 8:17)

- Resurrection of the just and the return of our Lord Jesus Christ:

His coming is imminent. The dead in Christ shall rise first: Then we that are alive and remain shall be caught up together with them in the clouds to meet the Lord in the air. (I Thess 4: 16-17, Acts 1:11)

== Current Leaders ==
- Pastor Robert Sawra of Assyrian Pentecostal Church in Turlock
- Pastor Robert Barcham of Assyrian Pentecostal Church in Urmia
- Pastor Yonathan Nader of Assyrian Pentecostal Church in Chicago
- Pastor William Nisan of Assyrian Pentecostal Church in Los Angeles
- Pastor Isac Warda of Assyrian Pentecostal Church in Sydney
- Pastor Victor Tamraz of Assyrian Pentecostal Church in Tehran
- Pastor Johnson Bayati of Assyrian Pentecostal Church in San Jose

== Language ==
The liturgical language spoken by the members, church choir, and the pastors is Assyrian Neo-Aramaic, a language descended from the Mesopotamian Aramaic introduced into the Assyrian Empire during the 8th century BC. Prayers and scripture are read and recited from a Syriac Aramaic Bible.

== Observed Holidays ==
The adherents of the Assyrian Pentecostal Church observe the following holidays:

- Christmas: (Eda Surah) also referred to as Christmas Day, is an annual holiday celebrated on December 25 that commemorates the birth of Jesus Christ.
- New Year's Eve: (Sheetah Khatah)
- Easter: (Eda Gurah) Assyrian Pentecostals celebrate Jesus Christs resurrection from the dead three days after his crucifixion, and celebrate this resurrection on Easter Day, or Easter Sunday, two days after Good Friday.
- Pentecost: (Yomit Pantacostayeh) Assyrian Pentecostals commemorate the descent of the Holy Spirit upon the Apostles and other followers of Jesus as described in the Book of Acts, Chapter 2.

== See also ==
- Assyrian Evangelical Church
- Assyrian Neo-Aramaic
- Assyrian People
- Pentecostalism
- Syriac Christianity
- Names of Syriac Christians
- Assyrians in Iran
- Assyrians in Iraq
- Assyrians in Syria
- Assyrians in Turkey
