= Golestaneh, West Azerbaijan =

Golestaneh گلستانه
- Village
- Location within Iran
- Coordinates: 37°15′02″N 44°53′19″E
- Country: Iran
- Province: West Azerbaijan
- County: Urmia
- Bakhsh: Silvaneh
- Rural District: Margavar

Population (2006)
  - Total: 555
- Time zone: UTC+3:30 (IRST)
  - Summer (DST): UTC+4:30 (IRDT)

Golestaneh (Persian: گلستانه, also Romanized as Golestāneh) is a village in Margavar Rural District, Silvaneh District, Urmia County, West Azerbaijan Province, Iran. At the 2006 census, its population was 555, in 81 families.
