= Protestant church of Tabriz =

Church in Tabriz, Iran

Coordinates: 38°04′14″N 46°17′11″E

The Protestant Church is a Christian church in Tabriz in northwestern Iran.

It is located in south Shahnaz street, near the Ararat Cultural Complex of the city.
