= Lulham, Iran =

Lulham لول هام
- Village
- Location within Iran
- Coordinates: 37°42′57″N 45°02′12″E
- Country: Iran
- Province: West Azerbaijan
- County: Urmia
- Bakhsh: Nazlu
- Rural District: Nazlu-e Shomali

Population (2006)
  - Total: 182
- Time zone: UTC+3:30 (IRST)
  - Summer (DST): UTC+4:30 (IRDT)

Lulham (Persian: لول هام, also Romanized as Lūlhām; also known as Golhām and Lolhām) is a village in Nazlu-e Shomali Rural District, Nazlu District, Urmia County, West Azerbaijan Province, Iran. At the 2006 census, its population was 182, in 50 families.
