= Tazeh Kand, Nazlu =

Tazeh Kand تازه كند
- Village
- Location within Iran
- Coordinates: 37°45′12″N 44°54′25″E
- Country: Iran
- Province: West Azerbaijan
- County: Urmia
- Bakhsh: Nazlu
- Rural District: Nazluchay

Population (2006)
  - Total: 112
- Time zone: UTC+3:30 (IRST)
  - Summer (DST): UTC+4:30 (IRDT)

Tazeh Kand (Persian: تازه كند, also Romanized as Tāzeh Kand) is a village in Nazluchay Rural District, Nazlu District, Urmia County, West Azerbaijan Province, Iran. At the 2006 census, its population was 112, in 17 families.
