= Baran Duz =

Village in West Azerbaijan province, Iran

Baran Duz Persian: باراندوز
- Village
- Location within Iran
- Coordinates: 37°24′17″N 45°05′32″E
- Country: Iran
- Province: West Azerbaijan
- County: Urmia
- District: Central
- Rural District: Baranduz

Population (2016)
  - Total: 632
- Time zone: UTC+3:30 (IRST)

Baran Duz (Persian: باراندوز) (Note: Also romanized as Bārān Dūz and Bārāndūz; Armenian: Բարանդուզ; Duz (also spelled Diz, Dez, or Dezh) means "castle" in Old Persian) is a village in, and the capital of, Baranduz Rural District in the Central District of Urmia County, West Azerbaijan province, Iran.

== Demographics ==
=== Population ===
At the time of the 2006 National Census, the village's population was 834 in 224 households. The following census in 2011 counted 672 people in 220 households. The 2016 census measured the population of the village as 207 households.
