= 1922–1923 Lausanne Conference =

Post-WW1 peace conference

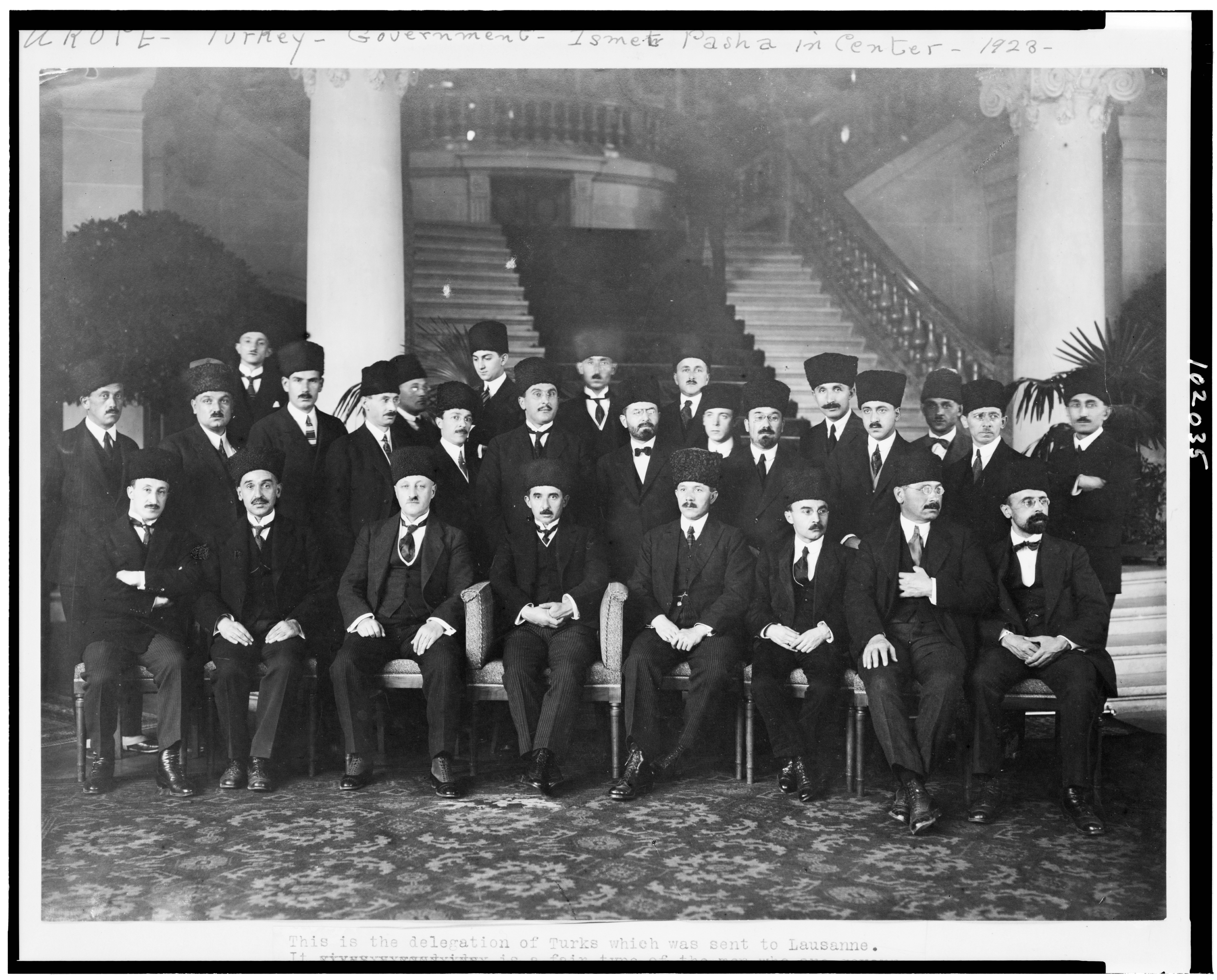
The Turkish delegation at the conference, 1923 (İsmet İnönü in the front row, fourth from left)

The Conference of Lausanne was a peace conference held in Lausanne, Switzerland between Allies and Turkey during 1922 and 1923 following the Turkish victory and the defeat of Allies in the Turkish War of Liberation and the following Armistice of Mudanya. Its purpose was the negotiation of a peace treaty after Turkish War of Liberation and Armistice of Mudanya and to replace the Treaty of Sèvres, which, under the new government of Mustafa Kemal Atatürk, was no longer recognized by Turkey.

The conference opened in November 1922, with representatives from Great Britain, France, Italy and Turkey. The Grand National Assembly of Turkey selected İsmet İnönü, Rıza Nur and Chief Rabbi Chaim Nahum as their representatives. Lord Curzon, the British Foreign Secretary, was the co-ordinator of the conference, which he dominated. France and Italy had assumed that the Chanak Crisis had caused British prestige with Turkey to be irrevocably damaged, but they were shocked to discover that Turkish respect for Britain was undiminished. British troops had held their positions at invaded Çanakkale, but the French had been ordered to withdraw.

The conference lasted for eleven weeks. It heard speeches from Benito Mussolini of Italy and Raymond Poincaré of France. The proceedings of the conference were notable for the stubborn diplomacy of İsmet İnönü towards full independence of Turkey (istiklâl-i tam). Already partially deaf, he would simply turn off his hearing aid when Curzon launched into lengthy speeches denouncing the Turkish position. Once Curzon was finished, İsmet İnönü (İsmet Pasha or General Mustafa İsmet back then) would restate his original full independence demands and be oblivious to Curzon's denunciations.

At the conclusion, Turkey assented to the political clauses and the "freedom of the straits", Britain's main concern. The matter of the status of Mosul (Britain invaded after armistice) was deferred since Curzon refused to be budged from the British position that the area was part of newly founded Iraq state. The French delegation, however, did not achieve any of its goals. On 30 January 1923, it issued a statement that it did not consider the draft treaty to be any more than a basis of discussion. The Turks, therefore, refused to sign the treaty. On 4 February 1923, Curzon made a final appeal to İsmet İnönü to sign, and when he refused, Curzon broke off negotiations and left that night on the Orient Express.

The Treaty of Lausanne was finally signed on 24 July 1923.

== Background ==
The harsh Treaty of Sèvres imposed upon the government of the Ottoman Empire after World War I by the Allied Powers included provisions that demanded the partition of Anatolia. The treaty demanded the occupation of French and Italian zones of occupation in the southeast and southwest, the cession of much of western Anatolia to Greece and the establishment of two independent states: Armenia and Kurdistan in the east and the southwest. The Ottoman state was to have a small army and navy without heavy artillery, aeroplanes or battleships, and its budget was to be placed under the supervisions of an Allied financial commission. Turkish nationalists were vehemently opposed to those clauses and decided to fight to inhibit their effectiveness.

In the Turkish War of Independence that followed, the Turkish Nationalist Army defeated the Greeks and created resolutions with the French and Italians to secure a sovereign, independent Turkish state in Anatolia.

== Preliminary meetings ==
The location of Lausanne, Switzerland, was chosen as a neutral venue by Britain, France and Italy to discuss their new policies in the Near East. Representatives of the Soviet Union would be invited solely to renegotiate the Straits Convention. Before the conference even began, Lord Curzon of Britain expressed doubts upon the reliability of France and Italy for support and stated, "I am not going into the conference in order to find myself let down very likely on the first day by the French or Italians". He demanded a preliminary meeting of the three nations to reach a preliminary strategy before he travelled to Lausanne. Curzon prepared a list of British demands separated into two categories. Essential ones included the Greek retention of Western Thrace, the freedom of the Straits to shipping, demilitarised zones on the coasts and the retention of Allied troops in Istanbul until a new treaty was ratified. Most desirable ones included measures for the protection of the minorities in Turkey, preliminary safeguards of the Armenian population, the satisfaction of Allied requirements of the Ottoman debt, capitulations and the future financial and economic regime in Turkey.

Preliminary meetings, taking place in Paris between Curzon and French Prime Minister Raymond Poincaré on 18 November 1922, lasted five hours. Poincaré addressed each of Lord Curzon's aims point by point and reluctantly agreed to most of them. Both then met with Benito Mussolini who quickly agreed to the agenda because of his overall indifference to the negotiations.

The first official meeting of the Lausanne Conference was held on 21 November 1922, and Curzon appointed himself president of the conference and instituted three subcommissions. The first and arguably most important one addressed territorial and military questions, the second one addressed the financial and economic questions and the third was meant to answer the future of judicial status of foreigners in Turkey. The first was chaired by Lord Curzon, the second by French Ambassador Camille Barrère and the third by the Italian diplomat Marquis Garroni.

On 23 November, Curzon's commission began its processions. İsmet Pasha delivered a long speech in which he demanded the cession of Karaagac, a suburb of Edirne, which had been retained by Greece as part of Western Thrace. Curzon responded by chastising the Turks for making what he considered to be excessive demands. He was met with widespread support by the French and Italians and went on to state that the "exhibition of so firm an Allied front at this stage and on so important an issue took [the] Turks very much by surprise and will probably exercise a decisive influence in our future proceedings". That feeling did not last, however, since by December, Turkish obstruction and stubbornness and Italian concessions had all but halted negotiations.

The Soviet delegation arrived in Lausanne on 28 November 1922 with Georgy Chicherin as its chief spokesman. It demanded to be admitted to the conference as a whole, and when the Straits Commission officially met on 5 December, it also demanded the closure of the Straits, both in peace and war, to warships and aircraft of all nations except Turkey. Both proposals were rejected, and any Soviet protest was ignored. Soviet envoy Vatslav Vorovsky was granted entry as an observer to the orient conference, but not as an official delegate, and the Soviets were not granted diplomatic protections by the Swiss government.

On 16 December, Curzon decided that he would remain at the conference over the Christmas holiday to expedite the conference's conclusion. He intended to draw up a preliminary treaty containing the points already agreed to in the meetings with the Turks and then he would invite İsmet Pasha to accept or reject it as a statement of agreed principle. Curzon would let experts fill in the rest. After Christmas, however, the increasing Turkish inflexibility on generally all significant clauses and rumors of an imminent Turkish military advance on Istanbul led Curzon to seek a private meeting with İsmet. Curzon found the Turkish foreign minister "impervious to argument, warning or appeal, and can only go on repeating the same catchwords, indulging in the same futil quibbles, and making the same childish complaints".

Curzon's intention of presenting the Turks with a preliminary treaty was further hindered by a lack of correspondence from Poincaré in regards to the acceptability of the conditions presented to France. In mid-January 1923, Maurice Bompard, who had taken the place of the sickly Barrere as chief French delegate, visited Paris to relay with Poincaré and returned to the Conference with a document of 24 headings dictated by Poincaré that represented a French demand for substantial concessions to Turkey on most issues to bring about a faster conclusion. Curzon described an "unconditional surrender to the Turks", adamantly refused to accept any of the "eleventh hour proposals" and went on to decide on a fixed date for the departure of the British delegation from the conference. On that day, he explained, the Turks would be asked to accept or to reject the text of the treaty that Britain was drawing up without including any of Poincaré's amendments.

When the draft was presented to the Turks on 31 January, İsmet asked for an adjournment of eight days. There were further meetings of the Allied delegations on the morning of 2 February during which Curzon reluctantly agreed to further modifications on capitulations and the tariffs, the abandonment of reparations due from Turkey and the removal of all restrictions on the size of the Turkish Army in Thrace. On 4 February, the Turks accepted all territorial terms of the draft treaty with a reservation about Mosul, but they rejected the judicial, economic and financial clauses and demanded reparations from Greece for the damage its army caused in İzmir, a demand that Curzon had already rejected because of the poverty of Greece. Although the Allies agreed to further slight changes in the economic clauses, the Turks still refused to sign the treaty on the grounds that the economic and the judicial clauses were still unsatisfactory.

It was then reported that for the next several hours, İsmet Pasha feigned total ineptitude in the understanding of the simplest of propositions. The ploy of stubbornness aimed to force another revision of the treaty. Every warning, argument or plea to İsmet lacked even the smallest effect. Then, negotiations broke down, and all parties returned to their respective capitals.

== Resolution ==
In early March 1923, a Turkish note suggested new propositions towards the still-unsettled financial, economic and judicial questions. Curzon accepted the Turkish proposals on the basis that the conference would be revived, but he ruled out any further revisions of the territorial clauses already resolved. Between 21 and 27 March 1923, British, French, Italian and Japanese experts met in London to discuss Allied criteria for the settlement of the still-unresolved issues of the conference.

The conference eventually reopened at Lausanne on 23 April 1923. Once again three commissions were set up. The first dealt with the remaining territorial questions and the rights of foreigners and was chaired by Sir Horace Rumbold, the primary British delegate, since Curzon refused to return to Lausanne. The second was under General Maurice Pellé, now the main French delegate, and dealt with financial questions. The third was under, the chief Italian delegate, and dealt with economic questions. Most of the proceedings were of a highly-technical nature and progressed slowly. France renewed its demand for the payment of reparations to the Allies by Turkey although, as Curzon pointed out, the Allies had agreed to abandon them in February.

No agreement be reached with Turks on the future judicial regime for foreigners in their country. Finally, the Turkish insistence for the Greeks to pay reparations to Turkey for war damage in İzmir almost led to a renewal of Turkish-Greek hostilities. On 24 April, the Greek delegation threatened to walk out of the conference on Saturday, the 26th, if the Turks did not accept the Greek offer of Karaağaç to replace reparations. Mustafa Kemal intervened, and his government agreed that İsmet could accept Karaagaç instead of reparations if it was coupled with a favourable settlement of the remaining questions. On the afternoon of the 26th, after appeals from all the delegates at the conference, İsmet accepted the compromise, which was coupled with rather-vague assurances by the Allies that every effort would be made to satisfy Turkish requirements on other issues.

However, after a further appeal to Poincaré by Crewe on 6 July, the former accepted a British proposal that a declaration about the debt interest should be omitted from the treaty, and the matter should be dealt with by a separate note from the Allies to Turkey. After a six-hour meeting on the subject between the Allied and the Turkish delegates, the issue was finally settled. At 1.30 a.m. on 9 July 1923, agreement was reached on the debt's interest, on concessions and on the evaluation of the Allies from Constantinople after Turkey had ratified the peace treaty.

However, there were still delays over the settlement of other minor issues, and it was only on 24 July 1923 that the treaty was signed at a plenary session of the conference.

Meanwhile, on 10 May 1923 Vorovsky was shot dead and two other Soviet envoys were wounded in a busy restaurant by Maurice Conradi, a Russian expat. The trial, with unapologetic defendants who disputed few facts, quickly became a moral indictment of the Bolshevik government itself, and was an international sensation. Conradi's acquittal severed formal Swiss-Russian relations until 1946.

== Treaty of Lausanne ==
It was known from early on in the conference that Turkey was left in a perilous position since much of it had been destroyed in the War of Independence. The Turks needed an end to conflict and normal relations with Europe to build and sustain their economy. Though İsmet Pasha, was extremely stubborn and near unworkable during the conference, he acted so mainly in matters that threatened Turkish independence. On matters that did not touch the heart of Turkish independence, İsmet eventually accepted Allied wishes to secure Turkey's place in the future economy. He easily accepted British and French colonial rule in Palestine, Syria and Iraq. Although İsmet would surely have loved to negate the old Ottoman debt, a great weight on the new state, he accepted a proportional division of the debt among the successor states of the empire.

On matters on independence, the Turks were resolute in their stance. The capitulations and the rules that had allowed foreigners to have their own legal systems in the Ottoman Empire, their own post offices and other extraterritorial rights were ended. Foreigners and minorities were to be governed by the same sets of laws and to have the same rights as Turks. Social and religious institutions of Christians were specifically allowed but not separate political institutions.

Furthermore, the treaty attempted to rectify the expulsion of entire populations in the Balkans by a population exchange. Greeks had lived in Anatolia for thousands of years, and the Turks had lived in what is now Greece for more than 500 years, but both Greece and Turkey had come to realise that the two populations could no longer live together in co-operation. The viciousness of the Balkan Wars essentially destroyed the tolerance between the cultures. Most of the Turks of Greece, in fact, had been expelled after 1878, especially in the Balkan Wars. Most Anatolian Greeks had fled in 1922. At Lausanne, Greece and Turkey agreed to relocate most of the Muslims and Greeks who had remained in the other's country. Only the Greeks of Istanbul and the Turks of western Thrace were excluded.

=== Mosul question ===
On 4 February 1923, while the Lausanne Conference was still in session, both obstinate parties laying claim to the Mosul region, Turkey and Britain, deferred the dispute from the conference's agenda since its deadlock was so firm. Since the First World War, the British had sought to contain the Bolshevik threat by expanding their presence in the Middle Eastern regions around Iraq, Iran, and Turkey. Turkey however remained adamant that the region was owed to them based on the racial unity of the Turks and the Kurds, arguments that most of the disputed area's trade was with Anatolia, the illegal occupation of the Allies in Mosul and the presence of self-determination from which the inhabitants actually wanted to be a part of Turkey. Lord Curzon, however, addressed each of these claims individually claiming that most majority of the inhabitants were racially Kurds who were of Indo-European origin and fundamentally different from the Turks, most of the trade of Mosul was with Iraq but not Anatolia, the British government had been legally entrusted with the mandate over Iraq by the League of Nations and the frequent Kurdish revolts during the nineteenth century immediately before the war demonstrated that the Kurds were unwilling to be a part of Turkey. Britain eventually brought the dispute before the League of Nations, which ruled that neither party had any right to occupy and control the area. The Kurdish population was instead divided between Turkey, Syria and Iraq, which ended any aspirations the Kurds had for self-determination.

In return for Turkey's concession, it was then afforded an invitation to join the League of Nations to complete the isolation of Bolshevik Russia.

=== Straits question ===
The Straits question of the conference further emphasised the prevailing paranoia of the encroaching Bolsheviks, especially by the Allies. At the end of the war, the victorious powers imposed the terms of the Treaty of Sèvres, which placed the control of the Straits under the Commission of the Straits. The commission would be composed of the representatives of the Great Powers and Greece, Romania, Bulgaria and Turkey. With the recovery of Turkish power in Anatolia, however, the peace treaty became inoperative within two years. The sessions of the conference devoted to the Straits became a duel between Curzon of Britain and Chicherin of Russia, the latter of whom demanded the passage of military vessels through the Straits to be prohibited at all times and the restoration of full Turkish sovereignty over the Bosphorus and the Dardanelles with an unrestricted right to fortify their shores. Eventually, the British prevailed by enacting Article I of the Straits Convention of 24 July 1923, which stated the principle of freedom of transit and of navigation through the Straits during both peace and war. Furthermore, Article IV stipulated that the shores of the Bosphorus and the Dardanelles as well as the contiguous islands in the Aegean and in Marmara would be demilitarised.

== Aftermath ==
The Lausanne Conference officially recognized the sovereignty of the new Republic of Turkey internationally. Turkey, in a sense, achieved what the Ottoman Empire had set out to do prior to World War I: receive equal treatment by the Western powers and assert its place in the international political sphere. The treaty restricted the boundaries of Greece, Bulgaria and Turkey and formally relinquished all Turkish claims on the Dodecanese Islands, Cyprus, Egypt and Sudan, Syria and Iraq. In Article 3, Turkey had its southern border also become rigidly defined, and it officially ceded the territories of Yemen, Asir, and parts of Hejaz, including Medina. Turkey also officially ceded Adakale Island in the River Danube to Romania by Articles 25 and 26. According to Article 10, Turkey gave up any of its privileges in Libya. The Armenians also lost hope of reestablishing a large presence in East Anatolia under the treaty and were instead afforded a small homeland in Soviet Armenia, which in 1922 became a part of the Transcaucasian Soviet Federated Socialist Republic.

Aside from the redrawing of geographic borders, Robert Gerwarth stated that the conference sanctioned relocation of ethnic and religious populations had inauspicious consequences and "had a significance that went well beyond the Greek and Turkish context to which it ostensibly applied. The Convention effectively established the legal right of state governments to expel large parts of their citizens on the grounds of 'otherness'. It fatally undermined cultural, ethnic and religious plurality as an ideal to which to aspire and a reality with which - for all their contestations - most people in the European land empires had dealt with fairly well for centuries".

== See also ==
- Commissions of the Danube River
- Lausanne Conference of 1932
- Treaty of Lausanne
- Turkish War of Independence
- Treaty of Sèvres
- World War I

== Bibliography ==
=== Primary sources ===
- Records of Proceedings and draft Terms of peace : Presented to Parliament by command of His Majesty, Cmd. 1814

=== Secondary sources ===
- Hanioglu, M. Sukru (2008). A Brief History of the Late Ottoman Empire. Princeton University Press.
- Dockrill, Michael (1993). "Britain and the Lausanne Conference, 1922-23". The Turkish Yearbook, XXIII.
- Cleveland, William L. (2004). A History of the Modern Middle East. Boulder, CO: Westview Press.
- Othman, Ali (1997). "The Kurds and the Lausanne Peace Negotiations, 1922-1923". Middle East Studies 33.
- Agoston, Gabor (2009). Encyclopedia of the Ottoman Empire. Facts on File Inc.
- Documents on British Foreign Policy, (tel 419 no. 169 ed.).
- McCarthy, Justin (2001). The Ottoman Peoples and the End of an Empire. Arnold Publishers.
- Goldstein, Erik. "The British Official Mind and the Conference of Lausanne, 1922-23". Diplomacy & Statecraft 14.
- Brown, Philip Marshall (1923). "The Lausanne Conference". The American Journal of International Law 17.
- Grew, Joseph G. "The Peace Conference of Lausanne, 1922-23". Proceedings of the American Philosophical Society 98.
- Macfie, A.L. (1998). The End of the Ottoman Empire 1908–1923. Longman.
- Hirschon, Renee (2009). "History’s Long Shadow: The Lausanne Treaty and Contemporary Greco-Turkish Relations". In the Long Shadow of Europe: Greeks and Turks in the Era of Postnationalism: 3. Brill.
- Xypolia, Ilia (2021). "Imperial Bending of Rules: The British Empire, the Treaty of Lausanne, and Cypriot Immigration to Turkey". Diplomacy & Statecraft. 32 (4): 674–691. doi:10.1080/09592296.2021.1996711. hdl:2164/18252.
- Zurcher, Eric J. (2004). Turkey: A Modern History. I.B. Tauris.
- Marabello, Thomas Quinn (2023) "The Centennial of the Treaty of Lausanne: Turkey, Switzerland, the Great Powers and a Soviet Diplomat’s Assassination," Swiss American Historical Society Review: Vol. 59: Available at: https://scholarsarchive.byu.edu/sahs_review/vol59/iss3/4
