= Basil Nikitin =

Basil Nikitin (Russian: Васи́лий Петро́вич Ники́тин, Russian pronunciation: [vɐˈsʲilʲɪj pʲɪˈtrovʲɪtɕ nʲɪˈkʲitʲɪn], 1 January 1885 – 7 June 1960) was a Russian orientalist and diplomat.

Basil Nikitin was born in Sosnowiec, a town in Poland, then part of the Russian Empire. Nikitin's family had several Orientalists. Therefore, he developed an interest in the subject as a boy. He took trips to the Black Sea region and the Caucasus. After graduation from high school in 1904, Nikitin traveled to Russia, where he enrolled at the Lazarev Institute to learn Persian and Turkish. In 1908, Nikitin applied for a job at the Foreign Ministry in Saint Petersburg. He was hired, and his first posting was to the Russian Embassy in Afghanistan. He served at the embassy for a year, returning to Paris and marrying.

In 1911, Nikitin once again found himself in a Russian Embassy. This time it was as Vice-Consul in Rasht, Gilan. Here he studied the agrarian question noting that landlords collected both state taxes and exacted a rent whose magnitude varied according to their greed. This situation had given rise to many peasants abandoning their villages.

In 1915, he was promoted to consul and based in Urmia. It was here that he arranged a meeting with Shimun XIX Benyamin, the Assyrian Patriarch who had agreed for Assyrian troops to join the Imperial Russian Army. Nikitin promised that after the First World War the Assyrians would be offered national community land in Russia. However, the matter was not pursued as the 1917 Revolution prevented further meaningful discussions. He served as ambassador for three years. During this term, Nikitin saw the outbreak of the First World War and the collapse of the Ottoman Empire. When the October Revolution broke out and the Russian monarchy was abolished, Nikitin decided against returning to Russia, and emigrated instead to France. After settling in France, he retired from politics and began writing books. He published several books, writing mostly about the Kurds and other people of the Middle East.

The time spend in the Middle East had endowed Nikitin with a deep insight into the Kurdish problem. He was, therefore, in a unique position to identify and understand the awakening of Kurdish nationalism. He closely studied the development of the Kurdish nationalism, classifying it in three phases. The first phase, which was marked by rioting, he referred to as the unorganized and directionless phase. The second phase, according to Nikitin, was the one that showed the first signs of organization. This phase was between 1880 and 1918. It was also the period during which the first Kurdish political parties and associations came into being. The third phase was the phase when the Kurds appeared as a political force on the international political scene, as demonstrated by historic agreements like the Treaty of Sèvres in 1920.

== Publications ==
- Quelques observations sur les Kurdes in Mercure de France
- Les Valis d'Ardalan in the journal Revue de monde musulman
- Les Kurdes et le Christianisme in the journal Revue de l'historie des religions, Paris 1922
- La vie domestique Kurd in the journal Revue d'ethnographie et des traditions populaires, Paris 1922
- The tale of Suto and Toto in the journal Bulletin of School of Oriental and African Studies, London 1923
- Kurdish Stories from my collection in the journal Bulletin of School of Orient and Africa Studies, London 1926
