= Edward Lewes Cutts =

English writer and antiquarian

- Born: 2 March 1824; Sheffield, England
- Died: 2 September 1901 (aged 77); Holy Trinity Vicarage, Haverstock Hill, England
- Occupations: Author, writer
- Writing career
- Language: English
- Genres: History, archaeology

Edward Lewes Cutts (2 March 1824 – 2 September 1901) was an English writer, antiquarian and curate, specialising in archaeology and the study of ecclesiastical history.

== Life and church career ==
Cutts was born on 2 March 1824 in Sheffield. He was the son of John Priston Cutts, an optician, and Mary, daughter of Robert Waterhouse. He was educated at Sheffield Collegiate School and graduated B.A. at Queens' College, Cambridge, in 1848. Being ordained in the same year, he was curate successively of Ide Hill, Kent, until 1850, of Coggeshall, Essex, until 1857, and of Kelvedon until 1859, and was perpetual curate of Billericay until 1865. He had already acted also as local organising secretary of the Additional Curates Society, and on leaving Billericay became general secretary of the society in London, resigning in 1871, on presentation to the vicarage of Holy Trinity, Haverstock Hill.

In 1876 Cutts was selected by the Archbishops of Canterbury and York to visit the East and inquire into the position of the Syrian and Chaldean churches; his report resulted in the formation of the Archbishop's Mission to the Assyrian Christians. He described his travels in 'Christians under the Crescent in Asia' (1887). Although accepting the ecclesiastical views of the high church party, he was sympathetic with every school of thought within the church. He received the degree of D.D. from the University of the South.

Cutts died at Holy Trinity Vicarage, Haverstock Hill, on 2 September 1901, and was buried at Brookwood Cemetery, Woking (Plot 4). He married on 23 April 1846 Marian, daughter of Robert Knight of Nottingham, and by her had ten children, seven of whom survived him. Mrs. Cutts died on 14 December 1889.

== Writing career ==
Cutts devoted himself to archæology and the study of ecclesiastical history. In 1849 he published 'A Manual for the Study of the Sepulchral Slabs and Crosses of the Middle Ages.' This was followed in 1853 by 'Colchester Castle not a Roman Temple.' From 1852 to 1866 he was honorary secretary of the Essex Archaeological Society and editor of its 'Transactions'. Cutts was also a contributor to The Art Journal.

In 1872 he published Scenes and Characters of the Middle Ages, a series of articles contributed originally to The Art Journal and in 1888 'Colchester,' in Freeman and Hunt's series of 'Historic Towns'; in 1893 'History of Early Christian Art'; and in 1898 'Parish Priests and their People in the Middle Ages in England.' Among his works on Church history are 'Turning Points of English Church History' (1874); 'Turning Points of General Church History' (1877); 'A Dictionary of the Church of England' (1887); 'A Handy Book of the Church of England' (1892); and 'Augustine of Canterbury' (1895) in Methuen's 'English Leaders of Religion.'

The most notable of his religious works are A Devotional History of Our Lord (1882) and Some Chief Truths of Religion (1875), which was translated into Swahili and printed at the Universities Mission Press at Zanzibar in 1895.

== Works ==
- Edward Lewes Cutts (1887). A Dictionary of the Church of England. Society for Promoting Christian Knowledge.
- Edward Lewes Cutts; Jesus Christ (1884). A devotional life of ... Jesus Christ.
- Edward Lewes Cutts (1875). Some chief truths of religion. Society for Promoting Christian Knowledge.
