= Central District (Urmia County) =

District in West Azerbaijan province, Iran

Central District (Urmia County) Persian: بخش مرکزی شهرستان ارومیه
- District
- Location within Iran
- Coordinates: 37°26′N 45°08′E
- Country: Iran
- Province: West Azerbaijan
- County: Urmia
- Capital: Urmia

Population (2016)
  - Total: 879,709
- Time zone: UTC+3:30 (IRST)

The Central District of Urmia County (Persian: بخش مرکزی شهرستان ارومیه) is in West Azerbaijan province, Iran. Its capital is the city of Urmia.

== Demographics ==
=== Population ===
At the time of the 2006 National Census, the district's population was 702,376 in 184,576 households. The following census in 2011 counted 806,861 people in 235,689 households. The 2016 census measured the population of the district as 879,709 inhabitants in 264,760 households.

=== Administrative divisions ===
Central District (Urmia County) Population
Administrative Divisions	2006	2011	2016
Bakeshluchay RD	22,672	28,864	34,683
Baranduz RD	11,502	11,088	12,008
Baranduzchay-ye Jonubi RD	10,068	9,416	11,408
Baranduzchay-ye Shomali RD	7,466	7,529	8,486
Bash Qaleh RD	9,862	9,994	10,043
Dul RD	8,524	7,530	7,487
Nazluy-e Jonubi RD	8,350	7,538	7,510
Rowzeh Chay RD	36,556	47,510	41,843
Torkaman RD	10,069	9,893	10,017
Urmia (city)	577,307	667,499	736,224
Total	702,376	806,861	879,709
RD = Rural District
