= St. Nicholas Church, Tehran =

Church in Tehran, Iranian national heritage site

St. Nicholas Orthodox Church
- Православная Церковь Св. Николая Чудотворца
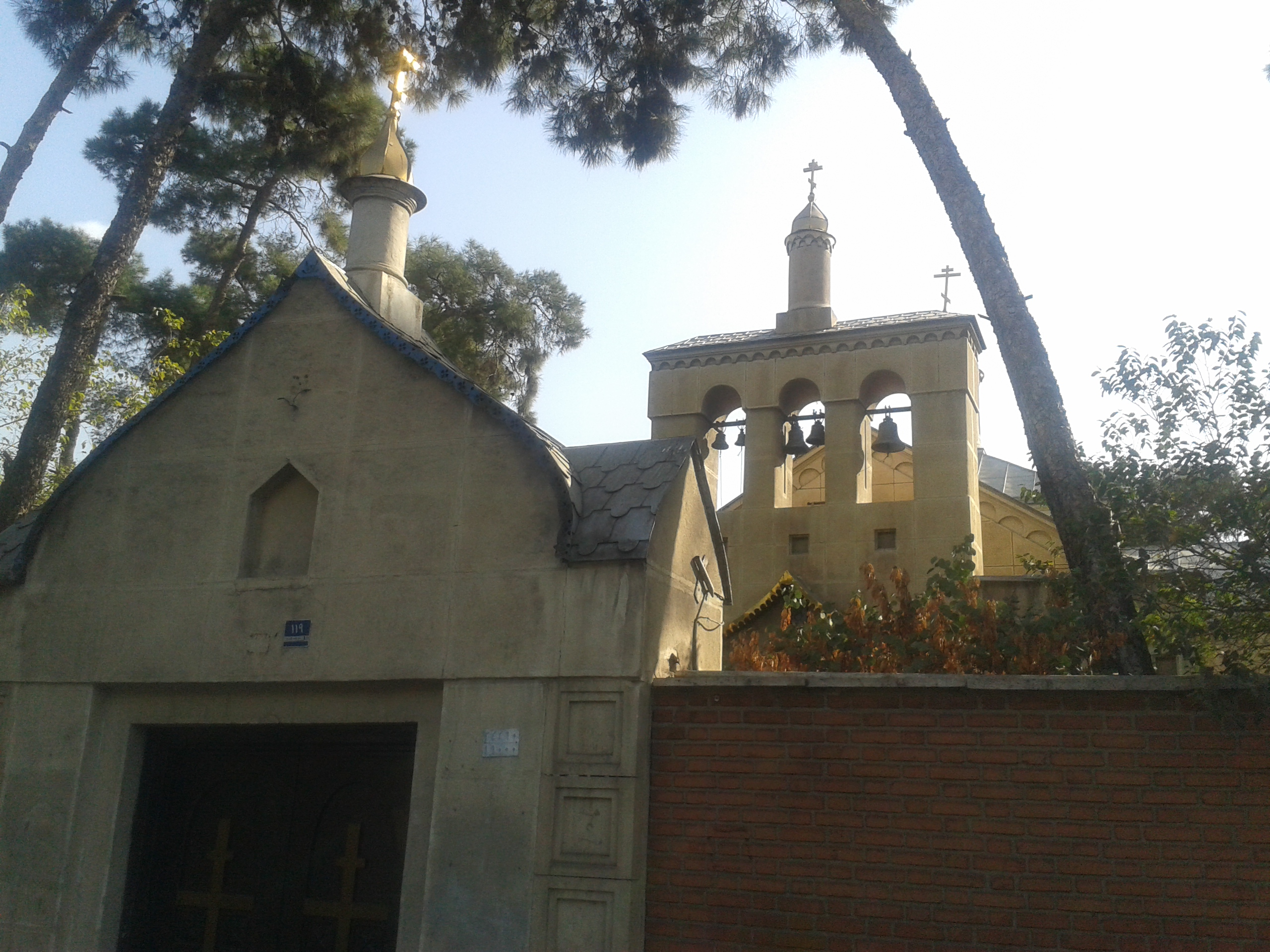

- Location within Iran

Religion
- Affiliation: Russian Orthodox Church

Location
- Location: Tehran, Tehran province, Iran
- Coordinates: 35.70836°N 51.42576°E

Architecture
- Groundbreaking: 1940s

St. Nicholas Orthodox Church (Persian: کلیسای سنت نیکولاس) is a Russian Orthodox church in Tehran, Iran.

== History ==
At the end of the 16th century a monk, Nicephorus, founded the first Russian parish in Safavid Iran. A Russian spiritual mission was operating in Iran by the beginning of the 20th century and, by 1917, there were about fifty Russian Orthodox churches. Over the next three years, everything that had been created over the previous three centuries was lost. In the early 1940s, a Russian church reappeared in Iran thanks to the donations of Russian emigrants - St. Nicholas Cathedral, which was under the administration of the Russian Orthodox Church Outside of Russia. In the 1980s and 1990s, the church was gradually abandoned, and in 1995, at the request of its parishioners, St. Nicholas Church was annexed to the Moscow Patriarchate.

During the 2026 Iran war, Russia's Ministry of Foreign Affairs reported that a strike in Tehran on the 1st April resulted in structural damage to the nearby church and it's auxiliary buildings.

== Administration ==
The Church is currently administered by Father Alexander.

== See also ==
- Russians in Iran
- Christianity in Iran
- Russian Church, Qazvin
- Iran–Russia relations
