= Urmia Orthodokseta =

Monthly magazine in Qajar Iran, 1904–1914

Urmia Orthodokseta Православная Урмия Pravoslavnaya Urmia
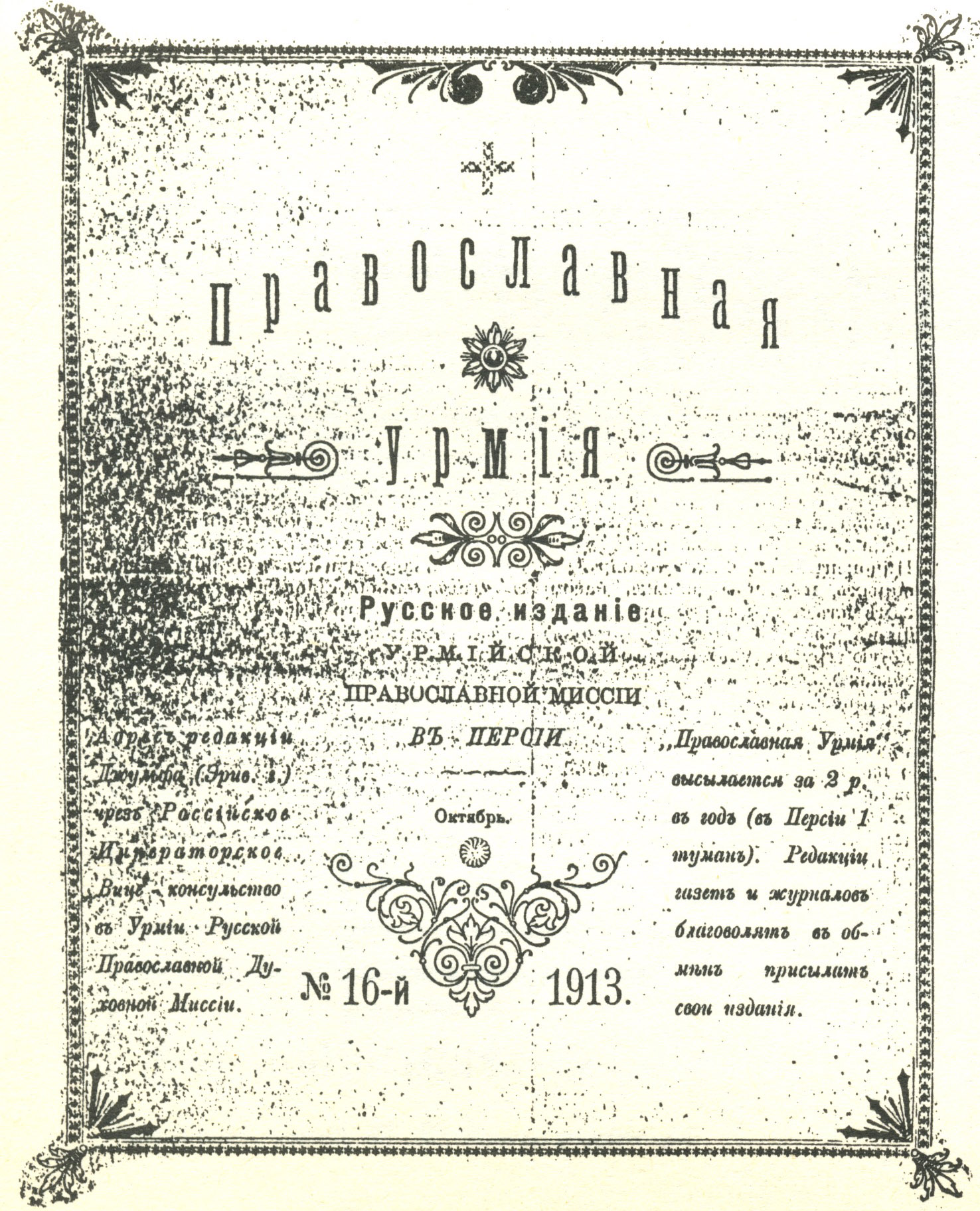
- Cover of Urmia Orthodokseta (issue of October, 1913), Russian-language edition.
- Type: Magazine
- Publisher: Russian Ecclesiastical Mission in Urmia
- Founded: 1904
- Ceased publication: 1914
- Language: Russian; Assyrian Neo-Aramaic
- Headquarters: Urmia
- Country: Qajar Iran

Urmia Orthodokseta ("Orthodox Urmia"; Russian: Православная Урмия, romanized: Pravoslavnaya Urmia) was a magazine published every month (with one interruption) from 1904 to 1914 in Urmia, Qajar Iran by the Russian Ecclesiastical Mission. It was published in both Russian and Assyrian Neo-Aramaic. Publication permanently came to an end in 1914 due to the outbreak of World War I.

In the early years of publication, the Russian and Neo-Aramaic versions contained the same articles, which, in the words of Lina Yakubova, were about topics of "general interest". However, this changed later. The Russian version focused primarily on the "geography and ethnography of the Assyrians". On the other thand, the Neo-Aramaic version changed into being "primarily religious in character", and specifically aimed at the "expansion of Russian Orthodoxy".

Yakubova notes that some issues of the magazine stood out in terms of content as they promoted then incumbent Tsar Nicholas II (1894-1917) as a "benevolent ruler".

== Circulation and format ==
Yakubova notes that separate versions of Urmia Orthodokseta, one in Russian and one in Assyrian Neo-Aramaic, were printed was due to fact that an ever increasing number of Assyrians in the area were converting to the Russian Orthodox rite and were attending the schools in the area founded and sponsored by the Russians. Furthermore, an increasing number of Russians were active in commerce and diplomacy in the area, as well as Russian military personnel. The magazine was thus primarily meant for Iran's Assyrian citizens and the Russian nationals inside the country. The magazine published some eight bilingual issues starting from 1905-1906. Publication of Urmia Orthodokseta was paused during the Iranian Constitutional Revolution (1905-1911), "when the Russian presence became more suspect", but continued in 1911 with the arrival of the Russian military.

The versions in Russian appeared in about 300 to 500 copies per circulation, while the Neo-Aramaic ones numbered 600 copies. The printing press used by the Mission to print the magazine was given to Iran by the new Soviet government.

== Subscription ==
Yakubova notes that people subscribed to Urmia Orthodokseta were mainly found in Urmia itself and in its confines. However, there were also people in Tiflis (Tbilisi) and Erivan (Yerevan) who were subscribed to Urmia Orthodokseta, as well as in other parts of the Russian Empire where Assyrians from Urmia had settled. The subscription costs were one toman per year in Iran, and two rubles per year in the Russian Empire.

== See also ==
- Russians in Iran
- Iran-Russia relations

== Sources ==
- Yakubova, Lina (2016). "URMIA ORTHODOKSETA". In Yarshater, Ehsan (ed.). Encyclopædia Iranica (Online ed.). Encyclopædia Iranica Foundation.
