= Russians in Iran =

Iranians of Russian descent

Iranian Russians
Regions with significant populations
- Tehran, Mazandaran Province, Gilan Province, Bushehr, Iranian Azerbaijan

Languages
- Russian, Persian

Religion
- Russian Orthodox Church, Shia Islam

Iranian Russians are Russians living in Iran or Iranians of Russian descent. Russians populate various regions, but mostly in those regions which had been under direct Russian military occupation in the past. This was an indirect result of the outcome of the last Russo-Persian Wars. Nowadays there are Russians located in the southern regions of the country as well (such as Bushehr), where many of them work as technicians and nuclear experts, on for example the Bushehr Nuclear Power Plant.

Although the community has shrunk significantly since the Second World War, the following Iran crisis of 1946 and the Iranian Revolution, Russians are known to be living in Iran since the time of the Safavids.

== History ==
Russians in Iran (Persia) have a long history dating back many centuries, all the way to the Middle Ages with the Caspian expeditions of the Rus', and later on the Russo-Persian War in the 18th century, when the Russian Empire temporarily occupied the Caspian regions of Tabaristan and Astarabad for a decade. However, the first mass-immigration of Russians into Iran occurred in the early 20th century when hundreds of thousands of White émigrés had to flee from the Bolsheviks. Most of them landed in the north Iranian provinces of Gilan and Mazandaran, but also in the northwest and northeast, in Iranian Azerbaijan and Khorasan, where communities of their descendants still live.

The Russian community kept increasing in the northern provinces of the country, as a result of the Russian sphere of influence which was established since the Russo-Persian War of 1826-28. This influence ended some decades later with the crisis of 1946.

Russia's influence in northern Iran was paramount from the signing of the Anglo-Russian Convention of 1907 until the outbreak of World War I in 1914. During this time period, it stationed troops in Iran's Gilan, Azerbaijan and Khorasan provinces, and its diplomatic offices (consulates) in these parts wielded considerable power. These consulates dominated the local Iranian administration and in some circumstances even collected local taxes. Starting in the same year as the Anglo-Russian Convention, unpremeditated Russian colonization commenced in Mazandaran and Astarabad provinces. Then, in 1912, Russian foreign policy officially adopted the plan to colonize northern Iran. At the outbreak of World War I, there were most likely some 4,000 Russian settlers in Astarabad and Mazandaran, whereas in northeastern Iran the Russians had founded a minimum of 15 Russian villages.

During the reign of Nicholas II of Russia, Russian occupational troops played a major role in the attempted Tsarist suppression of the Iranian Constitutional Revolution. In the dawn of the outbreak of World War I, Russian occupational forces occupied Qajar Iran's Azerbaijan province as well as the entire north and north-east of the country, and amounted to circa twenty thousand. Following the start of the Persian Campaign of World War I, the number of Russian troops in Iran moderately grew to some eighty or ninety thousand.

In the 1920s-1930s, the Soviet secret service (Cheka-OGPU-NKVD) carried out clandestine operations on Iranian soil as it tried to eliminate White émigrées that had moved to Iran. Starting from the mid-1930s, the capital of Tehran saw the development of a small colony of White émigrées from the regions surrounding Odesa and Vinnytsia (now Ukraine).

== Russian Orthodoxy ==
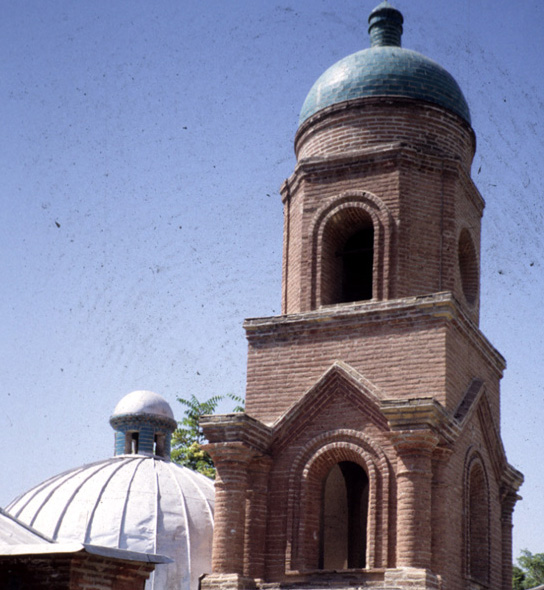
The Russian Church of Qazvin

The once numerous Russian Orthodox community in Iran has shrunken over the years. They are mostly the descendants of Russian émigrés and the permanently accredited staff of diplomatic and trade missions.

Tehran's Orthodox Community traces its history to the late 16th century.

St. Nicholas Church, Tehran was built the 1940s on donations from Russian émigrés. It was designed by émigré architect and Iranian Army officer Nikolai Makarov. As soon as the crosses appeared on its cupolas, the half-finished church opened its doors to parishioners. There were several Orthodox priests in Tehran before the 1979 Islamic Revolution. In the early 1980s, all of them were expelled. It was not until the late 1990s that the St. Nicholas Church received its new head priest. Hieromonk Alexander Zarkeshev was appointed by the Moscow Patriarchate to serve in Tehran.

== See also ==
- Bogatyr battalion
- Russian diaspora
- White émigré
- Russian Ecclesiastical Mission in Urmia
- St. Nicholas Church, Tehran
- Russian Church, Qazvin
- Urmia Orthodokseta
- Iran-Russia relations
- Russo-Persian Wars
- Iranians in Russia
- Anglo-Russian Convention of 1907
- Persian Cossack Brigade
- 1908 bombardment of the Majlis
- Persian Campaign
- Persian Socialist Soviet Republic
- Anglo-Soviet invasion of Iran
- Iran crisis of 1946
- 1953 Iranian coup d'état
- Project Dark Gene
- Russians in post-Soviet states
