= Russian Church, Qazvin =

Russian Orthodox Church in Iran

Coordinates: 36.2694°N 50.0101°E

Kantur Church, Qazvin
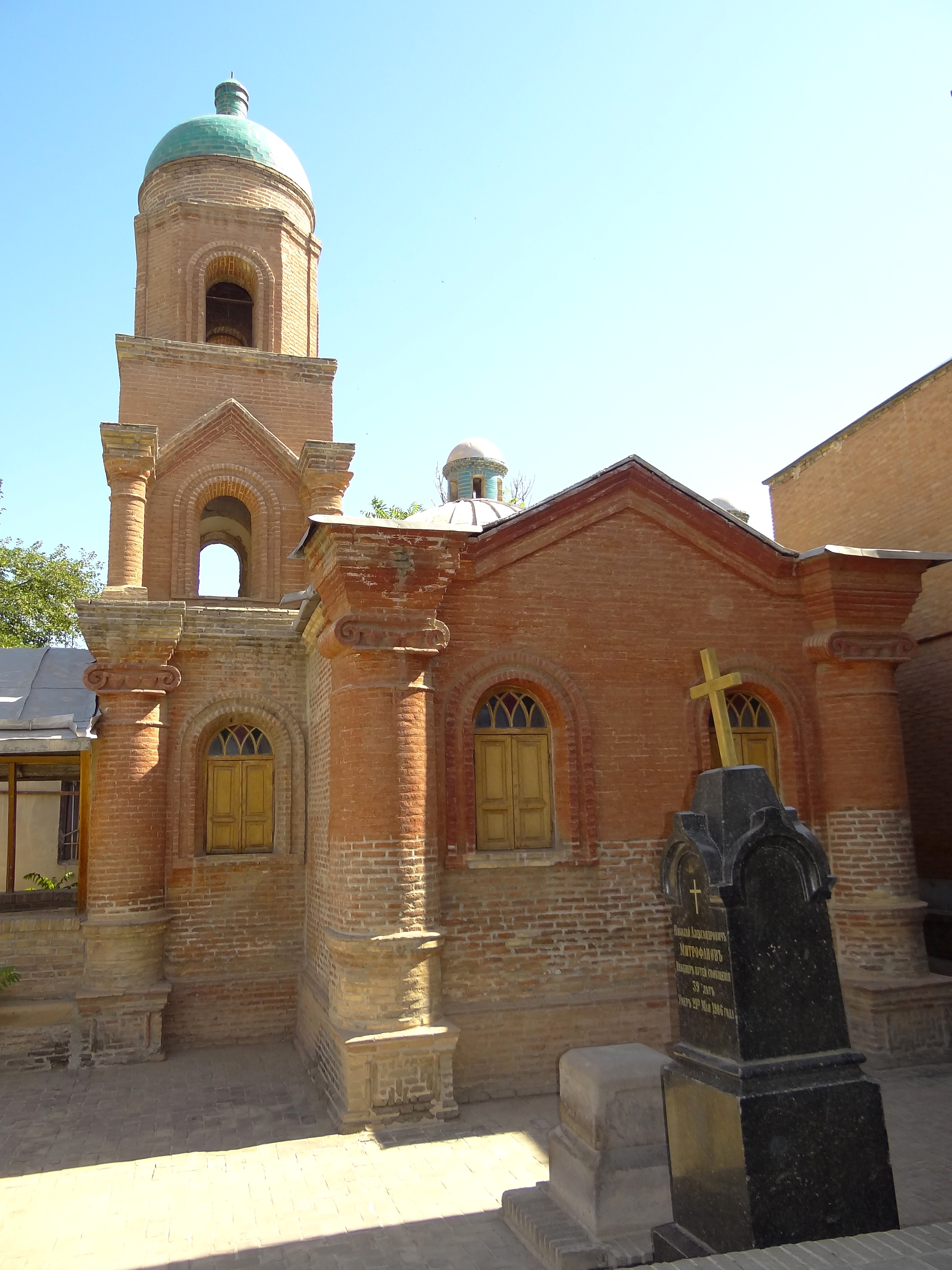

Religion
- Affiliation: Russian Orthodox Church

Location
- Location: Qazvin, Qazvin Province, Iran
- Interactive map of Kantur Church, Qazvin

Architecture
- Type: Church

Cantor (or Kantur) Church (Persian: کلیسای کانتور, romanized: Kelisa-ye Kantur) is a Russian Orthodox church in Qazvin, Iran.

== History and design ==
The church was built in 1905 for the Russian engineers hired for road constructions in Qazvin. The chapel, like other churches, has a cruciform plan with the altar facing east. The entrance is surrounded by two walls adorned with crosses. There is a three-storey bell-house at the entrance that is bounded by a small dome. Hall includes a chapel and altar, and on both sides, are two rectangular areas. The altar is in the shape of a half circle covered over the dome. Regarding the exterior of the church, decorative columns can be seen. Its architectural planning is based upon an irregular polygon made out of red bricks. The first floor of the bell tower of the chapel gives great views of the surrounding field. The paved churchyard leads to many tombs, one of which belongs to a Russian pilot who was killed when his plane went down during the war. In front of the church is a memorial to a Russian road engineer. The church is sometimes referred to as the "Cantor" or "Kantur" church from the name of the area where it stands.

== Gallery ==
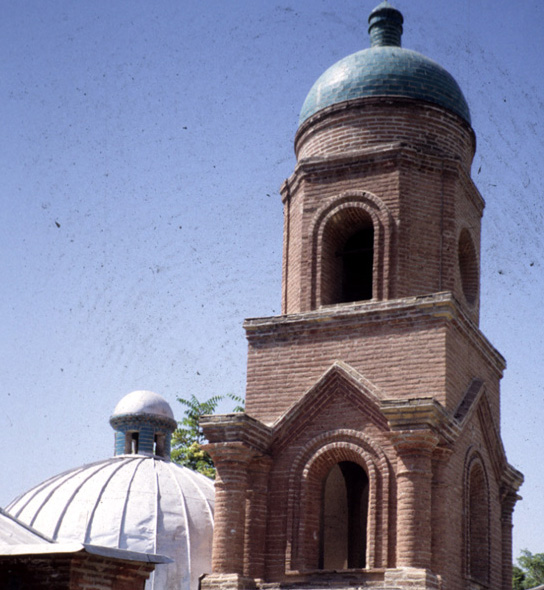
View of the upper part of the church.

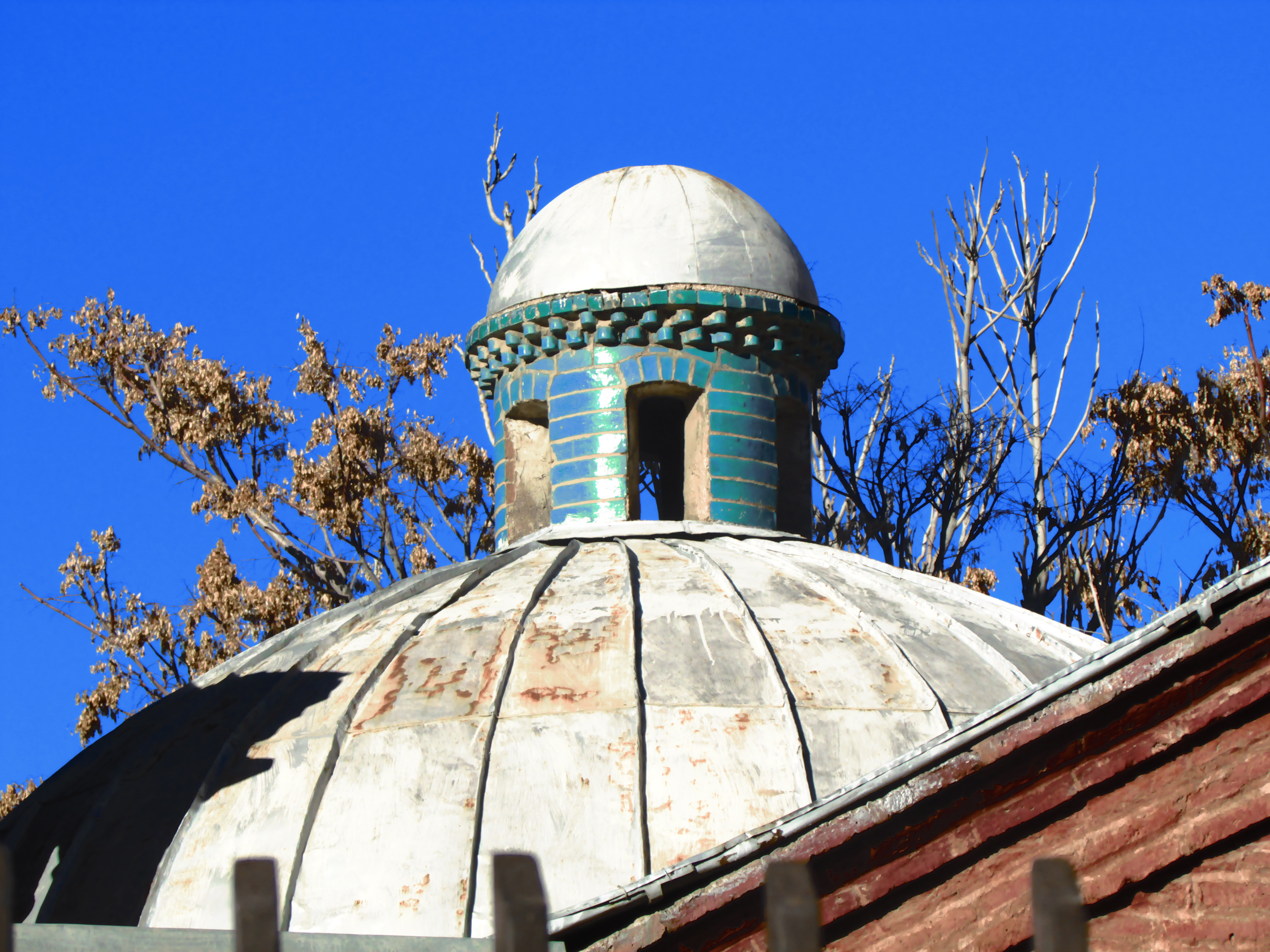
View of the small cupola.

== See also ==
- Russians in Iran
- St. Nicholas Church, Tehran
