= Iranians in Russia =

Russian Iranians
Total population
- 3,696 (2010 census) Excluding Tats, who are recorded separately as Таты ever since the first census of 1897

Regions with significant populations
- Moscow, Dagestan

Languages
- Russian, Persian, Azerbaijani

Religion
- Predominantly Shia Islam, with minorities of Sunni Islam

Iranian Russians or Persian Russians (Persian: ایرانیان روسیه; Russian: Иранцы в России) are Iranians in the Russian Federation, and are Russian citizens or permanent residents of (partial) Iranian national background.

Iranians have a long history within what is modern-day Russia, stretching back millennia to the Scythia and beyond. With their historical core in southern Dagestan and the pivotal Iranian town of Derbent, the territory remained, intermittently, in Iranian hands encompassed for many centuries until 1813, resulting in a steady flow and settling of people from mainland Iran. There are two historically Iranian communities in Russia; the Tats, who are amongst the native inhabitants of the North Caucasus, and the Mountain Jews, who descend from Persian Jews from Iran.

== Historical context ==
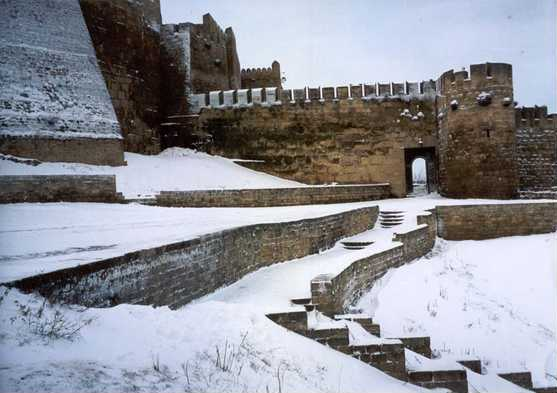
Derbent is renowned for the Sassanid Iranian fortress, a UNESCO world heritage site.

People from the former and contemporary boundaries of Iran have a long history in the territory of what is modern-day Russia, stretching back thousands of years. Throughout history, the Caucasus region was usually incorporated into the Iranian world, and large parts of it were ruled by empires based in modern-day Iran for a time span encompassing many centuries, or were under its direct influence. From the early 16th century up to including the early 19th century, Transcaucasia and a part of the North Caucasus (namely Dagestan), were ruled by the successive Safavid, Afsharid, and Qajar dynasties of Iran, and made up part of the latters concept for centuries. In the course of the 19th century, by the Treaty of Gulistan of 1813 and the Treaty of Turkmenchay of 1828, Iran ceded the region to Russia.

The Tats are amongst the native inhabitants of the Northern Caucasus and descent from Iranian settlers from during the Sasanian Empire.

== Iranian settling in Derbent, Dagestan ==
A traditionally and historically Iranian city, the first intensive settlement in the Derbent area dates from the 8th century BCE; the site was intermittently controlled by the Persian monarchs, starting from the 6th century BCE. The modern name is a Persian word (دربند Darband) meaning "gateway", which came into use in the end of the 5th or the beginning of the 6th century CE, when the city was re-established by Kavadh I of the Sassanid dynasty of Persia, however, Derbent was probably already into the Sasanian sphere of influence as a result of the victory over the Parthians and the conquest of Caucasian Albania by Shapur I, the first shah of the Sassanid Persians. In the 5th century Derbent also functioned as a border fortress and the seat of a Sassanid marzban.

As mentioned by the Encyclopedia Iranica, ancient Iranian language elements were absorbed into the everyday speech of the population of Dagestan and Derbent especially during the Sassanian era, and many remain current. In fact, a deliberate policy of “Persianizing” Derbent and the eastern Caucasus in general can be traced over many centuries, from Khosrow I to the Safavid shahs Ismail I, and ʿAbbās the Great. According to the account in the later "Darband-nāma", after construction of the fortifications Khosrow I “moved much folk here from Persia”, relocating about 3,000 families from the interior of Persia in the city of Derbent and neighboring villages. This account seems to be corroborated by the Spanish Arab Ḥamīd Moḥammad Ḡarnāṭī, who reported in 1130 that Derbent was populated by many ethnic groups, including a large Persian-speaking population.

Derbent remained a pivotal Iranian town until it was ceded in 1813 per the Gulistan treaty. The native Tat Persian community of Derbent and surroundings, who descend from Iranian migrations from what is modern-day Iran, has severely dwindled since the late 19th century due to assimilation, absorption, and migrations back to Iran (as well as to neighboring Azerbaijan).

In the 1886 population counting of the Dagestan Oblast, of the 15,265 inhabitants Derbent had, 8,994 (58,9%) were of Iranian descent (Russian: персы) thus comprising an absolute majority in the town.

== Migration and settlement from the Safavid era up to including the end of the Russian Empire ==
In 1509, 500 Karamanli Turkic families from Tabriz settled in Derbent. An unknown number of Turkic-speakers from the Kurchi tribe were resettled her in 1540. Half a century later, 400 more families of the Turkic-speaking Bayat clan were relocated to Derbent on the orders of Abbas I. Finally, in 1741, Nadir Shah relocated Turkic-speakers from the Mikri clan to Derbent.

Such assimilation notably affected not only Turkic-speaking peoples of Dagestan. In the past, southern Dagestan had a large Tat (Persian) population which originally spoke an Iranian language (a dialect of Persian) like other Tats, and are amongst the native inhabitants of the Caucasus who migrated from modern-day Iran. In 1866, they numbered 2,500 people and by 1929 lived in seven villages, including Zidyan, Bilgadi, Verkhny Chalgan, and Rukel. However, by the beginning of the 20th century most of them had become Azeri-speaking and assumed Azeri identity in the later decades.

The population of maritime Caspian regions has historically had strong economic ties with the city of Astrakhan on the northern Caspian shore. In particular, Azeris, known to the local population as Persians or Shamakhy Tatars, were represented in the city already in 1879, when there was about a thousand of them. The community grew in the Soviet times and in 2010 consisted of 5,737 people, making Azeris the fourth largest ethnicity in the oblast and 1,31% of its total population.

As the Encyclopædia Iranica states, the number of Persians in the Russian empire or its territories increased steadily in the second half of the 19th century following the forced ceding of the Caucasus of Qajar Iran to Russia several decades earlier by the Treaty of Gulistan of 1813 and the Treaty of Turkmenchay of 1828. These migrants consisted primarily from Persia’s northern provinces (chiefly Iranian Azerbaijan), who traveled to the Caucasus and, to some extent, to Central Asia in search of employment. Although the bulk of migrants were involved in some form of short-term or circular migration, many stayed in Russia for longer periods or even settled there.

The first traces of migration were recorded as early as 1855. The British consul in Tabrīz, K. E. Abbott, reported more than 3,000 passes issued by the Russian consulate in two months alone. However, the process gathered pace after the 1880s, and by the turn of the century it had achieved a scale and consistency that was sufficient to win the attention of many scholars, travelers, and commentators of the time.

According to the returns from the first national census of Russia of 1897, and cited by the Encyclopædia Iranica, some 74,000 Persian subjects were enumerated in the various parts of the empire as of 28 January 1897. Of these roughly 28 percent (21,000) were females. The largest single grouping was in the Caucasus region, which accounted for 82 percent of the total. As the census states, within the region the four major towns of Baku, Elisavetpol (Ganja), Erivan, and Tbilisi accounted for as many as 53,000 or about 72 percent of all Persians in the whole empire. Next to Caucasus in numbers of Persian residents was Central Asia, where numbers surpassed 10,000. According to the same [1897 census] source, Persian-speakers (as distinct from Persian subjects) numbered only about 32,000, suggesting the predominance of Azeri-speaking Azerbaijanis among the migrants.

Gender Composition and Geographic distribution of Persian-Speaking and Persian Subjects in the Caucasus (1897)

| | Region and cities | Males and females | Males | Females | Percentage of females |
|---|---|---|---|---|---|
| 1 | Caucasus | 71,432 | 54,678 | 16,754 | 23,5 |
| 2 | Baku | 29,941 | 22,012 | 7,929 | 26,4 |
| 3 | Tbilisi | 10,133 | 7,749 | 2,384 | 23,5 |
| 4 | Yerevan | 8,458 | 5,239 | 3,219 | 38,0 |
| 5 | Elisabethpol | 13,014 | 8,391 | 4,623 | 35,5 |
| 6 | Dagestan | 3,571 | 2,582 | 989 | 27,0 |

There are many travelers’ accounts and political memoirs that attest to the importance of the numbers involved, but they are often considered to be contradictory or incomparable. Ethner notes that further useful information is, however, available from data on passports and visas issued at the Russian consulates in Tabriz, Mashhad, Rasht, and Astarabad. These data reinforce a picture of consistently rising numbers of Persian travelers to Russia, averaging about 13,000 per year for the period 1876-1890 and rising to over 67,000 at the turn of the century. By 1913 over a quarter of a million Persians (274,555) were reported to have entered Russia. However, this excludes illegal migration, which by many accounts was also substantial. Equally large numbers of Persians were reported to have left Russia each year (e.g., 213,373 in 1913). As Hakimian further states, it has been estimated that net immigration to Russian territories amounted to about 25,000 each year on average between 1900-13. The total number of Persians in Russia before World War I is thus likely to have been about half a million (Hakimian, 1990, pp. 49–50).

According to other accounts too, the politicization of Persian workers in Russia was extensive during a period beset by revolutionary turmoil in both countries. In the 1906 strike in the copper mines and plants of Alaverdi in Armenia about 2,500 Persian Azerbaijanis were believed to constitute the core of strikers. This politicization was also reflected in the forcible extraditions of 1905 referred to above, as note d by Belova.

Persians also took part in political activities between World War I and the October Revolution. In 1914, as Chaqueri states, workers residing in Baku took part in street demonstrations against the outbreak of war. Soon after the October Revolution, a group of Persian workers in Baku founded the party ʿEdālat, which was to become the Communist Party of Persia in 1920.

== Soviet era ==
During the Soviet era, Iranians in Russia comprised a small but politically active community, concentrated primarily in Moscow and Leningrad. In the 1920s and 1930s, Iranian communists and members of the Tudeh Party found refuge in the Soviet Union after crackdowns in Tehran; many received political training at the Communist University of the Toilers of the East and worked with Soviet authorities to broadcast propaganda into Iran. Simultaneously, a limited number of Iranian merchants and craftsmen settled in Central Asian republics such as Turkmenistan and Uzbekistan, maintaining ties with cross-border trade networks along the Caspian Sea.

During World War II, the Soviet occupation of northern Iran (1941–1946) led to the relocation of several thousand Iranian laborers and POWs into the Azerbaijan and Armenian SSRs, where they contributed to industrial projects under harsh conditions. Following the war, repatriation agreements returned most to Iran, though a core group—fearful of political reprisals—remained and assimilated into local communities.

From the 1950s through the 1970s, Soviet universities admitted Iranian students on scholarship, fostering a cohort of engineers, physicians and educators who later shaped Iran’s post-revolutionary state. Despite periodic suspicions during the Cold War, the Iranian diaspora in the USSR maintained cultural associations, published Persian-language materials, and served as unofficial intermediaries in Tehran-Moscow relations until the dissolution of the Soviet Union.

== Historical Iranian communities in Russia ==
=== Tats ===
The Tats are amongst the native inhabitants of Dagestan. They are a Persian people and are descendants of settlers from modern-day Iran. They speak a dialect of Persian.

=== Mountain Jews ===
Mountain Jews are descendants of Persian Jews from Iran, who migrated to the North Caucasus and parts of Transcaucasia. In Russia, they inhabit Chechnya, Kabardino-Balkaria, and Krasnodar Krai.

== Notable Iranians in Russia and Russians of Iranian descent ==
- Fazil Iskander, writer
- Ivan Lazarevich Lazarev, jeweler
- Amanullah Mirza Qajar, military commander
- Presnyakov brothers, writers, playwrights, screenwriters, directors, theatre producers, and actors.
- Hayk Bzhishkyan, military commander
- Aleksander Reza Qoli Mirza Qajar, military leader, commander of Yekaterinburg (1918)
- Hasan Arfa, military general
- Feyzulla Mirza Qajar, military commander
- Firuz Kazemzadeh, professor emeritus of history at Yale University
- Alexander Kasimovich Kazembek, orientalist, historian, and philologist
- Sardar Azmoun, footballer
- Habibullah Huseynov, military commander and Hero of the Soviet Union
- Fatma Mukhtarova, Soviet opera singer
- Ivan Galamian, violin teacher
- Freydun Atturaya, physician
- Mirza Abdul'Rahim Talibov Tabrizi, intellectual and social reformer
- Bogdan Saltanov, painter

== See also ==
- Derbent
- Iran-Russia relations
- Azerbaijanis in Russia
- Russians in Iran

== Sources ==
- Fisher, William Bayne; Avery, P.; Hambly, G. R. G; Melville, C. (1991). The Cambridge History of Iran. Vol. 7. Cambridge: Cambridge University Press. ISBN 0521200954.
- N. K. Belova, “Ob Otkhodnichestve iz Severozapadnogo Irana, v Kontse XIX- nachale XX Veka,” Voprosy Istoriĭ 10, 1956, pp. 112–21.
- C. Chaqueri (Ḵ. Šākerī), ed., Asnād-e tārīḵī-e jonbeš-e kārgarī, sosīāl-demokrāsī wa komūnīstī-e Īrān I, Florence, 1969; IV. Āṯār-e Avetīs Solṭānzāda, rev. ed. Tehran and Florence, 1986. Mīrzā Reżā Khan Dāneš, Īrān-e dīrūz, Tehran, 1345 Š./1966.
- M. L. Entner, Russo-Persian Commercial Relations, 1828-1914, The University of Florida Monographs 28, Gainesville, 1965.
- E. Gordon, Persia Revisited, London, 1896.
- H. Hakimian, “Wage, Labor and Migration. Persian Workers in Southern Russia,” IJMES 17/4, 1985, pp. 443–62.
- V. Minorsky, “Dvizhenie persidskikh rabochikh na promysly v Zakavkaze,” Sbornik Konsulskikh Doneseniy (Consular Reports) 3, St. Petersburg, 1905.
- E. Orsolle, La Caucase et la Perse, Paris, 1885.
- A. Seyf, Some Aspects of Economic Development in Iran, 1800-1906, Ph.D. dissertation, Reading University, U.K., 1982.
