= Iranian–Russian Treaty on Comprehensive Strategic Partnership =

2025 treaty

- Type: Treaty
- Signed: 17 January 2025
- Location: Moscow, Russia
- Ratified: 16 April (Russia); 11 June (Iran)
- Effective: 2 October 2025
- Signatories: President Masoud Pezeshkian; President Vladimir Putin
- Parties: Iran; Russia
- Ratifiers: Islamic Consultative Assembly; Guardian Council; State Duma; Federation Council
- Languages: Russian; Persian

The Iranian–Russian Treaty on Comprehensive Strategic Partnership is a strategic partnership agreement signed on 17 January 2025, by Russian President Vladimir Putin and Iranian President Masoud Pezeshkian. The treaty aims to improve ties between the two nations. through expanding economic cooperation, mitigating the impact of US sanctions, and strengthening military and political partnership. The agreement is designed to govern relations between Russia and Iran for the next 20 years, covering various areas including defense, counter-terrorism, energy, finance, and culture. The agreement aims to boost trade and economic ties, with bilateral trade having risen by 15.5% to $3.77 billion between January and October 2024.

== Provisions ==
The treaty consists of 47 articles addressing cooperation in technology, information and cybersecurity, peaceful nuclear energy collaboration, counter-terrorism efforts, regional cooperation, environmental issues, and combating money laundering and organized crime.

== Ratification ==
The Russian State Duma ratified the treaty on 8 April 2025, and the Federation Council on 16 April. Vladimir Putin signed the treaty into law on 21 April. The Iranian Parliament ratified the treaty on 21 May, and the Guardian Council on 11 June. The treaty came into effect on 2 October 2025.

== See also ==
- Iran–China 25-year Cooperation Program
- North Korean–Russian Treaty on Comprehensive Strategic Partnership
- BRICS
- Shanghai Cooperation Organization
- Iranian energy crisis
