= Russian Ecclesiastical Mission in Urmia =

The Russian Ecclesiastical Mission in Urmia (Русская духовная миссия в Урмии) or Orthodox Mission in Urmia (Урмийская духовная миссия) was a Russian Orthodox mission to the ethnic Assyrians who lived in the border regions with Russia, mainly in the Persian Azerbaijan province, and who converted from the Assyrian Church of the East and Chaldean Catholic Church in 1898. Formally, the mission covers only twenty years (1898–1918), but Russian interest in the region prior to its establishment lasted almost the entire 19th century.

== History ==
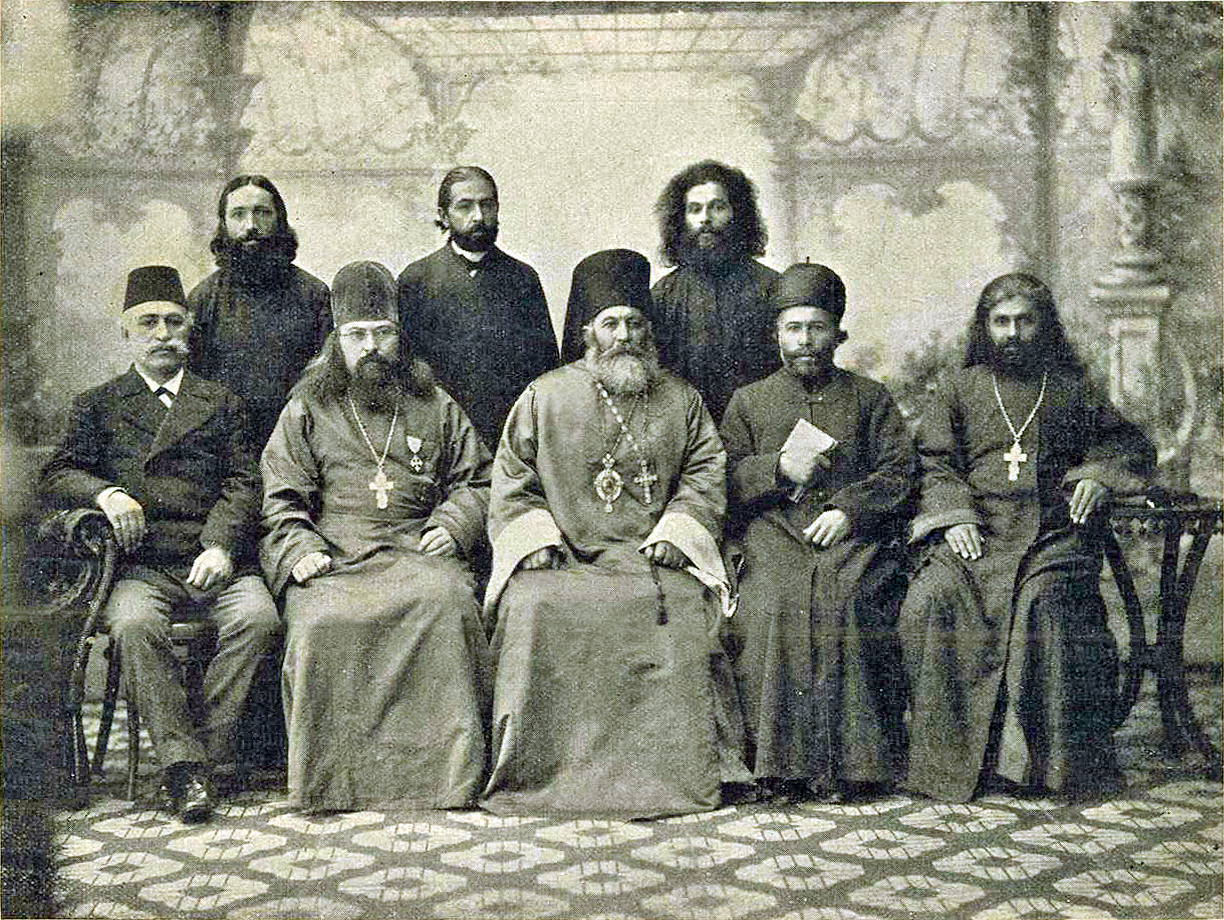
Joining the Syro-Chaldean Nestorians to the Orthodox Church in 1898. St. Petersburg

There was a group from the Assyrian Church of the East that converted to Orthodoxy in 1898. In the mid 1890s, bishop Mar Yonan of Supurghan in the region of Urmia, petitioned the Holy Synod of the Russian Orthodox Church that he and his flock be received into the Russian Church. Mar Yonan traveled to Saint Petersburg in 1898, where he and several of his clergy accepted Eastern Orthodoxy. They were received into the Russian Orthodox Church by confession of faith and vesting on the Feast of the Annunciation at the Holy Trinity Cathedral in Saint Alexander Nevsky Lavra. The services were presided over by Metropolitan Palladius (Raev) of Saint Petersburg. Also in 1898, the Holy Synod of the Russian Orthodox Church established the Russian Ecclesiastical Mission in Urmia, in order to aid Mar Yonan(ru) in the conversion and education of his flock.

Along with Bishop Yonan, Archimandrite Elia (Abraham) converted to Orthodoxy in 1898. In 1904 he was consecrated to the episcopate, as bishop of Tergawar in the region of Urmia, and became vicar of Bishop Yonan.

Since 1904, the mission published the magazine Orthodox Urmia in both the Assyrian-Aramaic and Russian languages.

In 1918, renewed persecution by the Muslims resulted in a mass exodus of indigenous Christians (including Assyrians, Armenians and Georgians) from northern Persia. Over 100,000 Christians fled northern Persia heading south to Iraq; untold numbers were massacred along the way. The Orthodox Assyrians eventually ended up in Baghdad.

After the Russian Revolution, Bishop Elia could no longer communicate with Patriarch Tikhon in Moscow, and joined the Russian Orthodox Church Abroad.

Bishop Elia died in December 1928, and he was succeeded by Bishop John (Gewarigis), who was consecrated to the Epicopate in Belgrade in 1931 by Metropolitan Anthony (Khrapovitsky) and Archbishop Germogen (Maximov).

Bishop John resided in Baghdad where most of his flock lived. He retired due to old age in 1945, and eventually made his way to the U.S., where he lived with his son in Chicago. In the early 1950s, Bishop Nikon (Rklitsky), while visiting Chicago, "had a wonderful meeting with Bishop John of Urmia and Salma, the eldest member of our Council of Bishops, and spiritual head of the Orthodox Assyrians." Vladika Nikon noted that Bishop John spoke the same language as that spoken by Christ the Savior, and had been the translator at the Russian Ecclesiastical Mission in Urmia. After moving to Chicago to live in retirement, he found there were several thousand of his fellow Orthodox Assyrians, who were spiritually undernourished, living in the Chicago area. When Vladyka Nikon visited Bishop John, he found him "surrounded by Americans of Assyrian origin", to whom Bishop John was reading the Bible in their native language. The Synod of Bishops, through Archbishop Gregory (Borishkevitch) of Chicago and Cleveland (later of Chicago, Detroit and Midwest America), Protopresbyter Arkadii Tsepuro, Protopresbyter George Grabbe (later Bishop Gregory of Washington & Florida), and Protopresbyter Adrian Rymarenko (later Archbishop Andrew of Novo Diveyevo) arranged for Bishop John to live in retirement at the Novo Diveyevo Convent in Spring Valley, New York. He reposed at Novo Diveyevo in 1960 at the age of 105, and is buried in the cemetery located there.

== Heads ==
- Archimandrite Theophylact (Klementyev) (1898 - 1902)
- Archimandrite Cyryl (Smirnov) (1902 - 1904)
- Bishop Sergius (Lavrov) (1904 - 1916)
- Bishop Pimen (Belolikov) (1916 - 1917)
- Archimandrite Vitaly (Sergeyev) (1922 - 1946)

== Literature ==
- Abramtsov, David (1960). "The Assyrians of Persia and the Russian Orthodox Church". One Church. 14: 155–169.
- Baum, Wilhelm; Winkler, Dietmar W. (2003). The Church of the East: A Concise History. London-New York: Routledge-Curzon. ISBN 9781134430192.
- Bolshakoff, Serge (1943). The Foreign Missions of the Russian Orthodox Church. London: Society for Promoting Christian Knowledge.
- Coakley, James F. (1992). The Church of the East and the Church of England: A History of the Archbishop of Canterbury's Assyrian Mission. Oxford: Clarendon Press. ISBN 9780198267447.
- Ольга Ходаковская Там где сияют горные вершины Документальное исследование жизни и трудов преосвященного Пимена епископа Семиреченского и Верненского, священномученика
- Садо, Стефан (1996). "Российская православная миссия в Урмии (1898-1918)" (PDF). Христианское чтение. 13: 73–112.
- Садо, Стефан (1997). "Профессор Санкт-Петербургской духовной академии В. В. Болотов и вопрос о чиноприеме воссоединения несториан с Русской Православной Церковью в конце XIX в." (PDF). Христианское чтение. 14: 97–123.
- Yakubova, Lina (2016). "URMIA ORTHODOKSETA". Encyclopaedia Iranica.
- Wilmshurst, David (2000). The Ecclesiastical Organisation of the Church of the East, 1318–1913. Louvain: Peeters Publishers. ISBN 9789042908765.

This article incorporates text from Russian Ecclesiastical Mission in Urmia at OrthodoxWiki which is licensed under the CC-BY-SA and GFDL.
