= Iran–Russia relations =

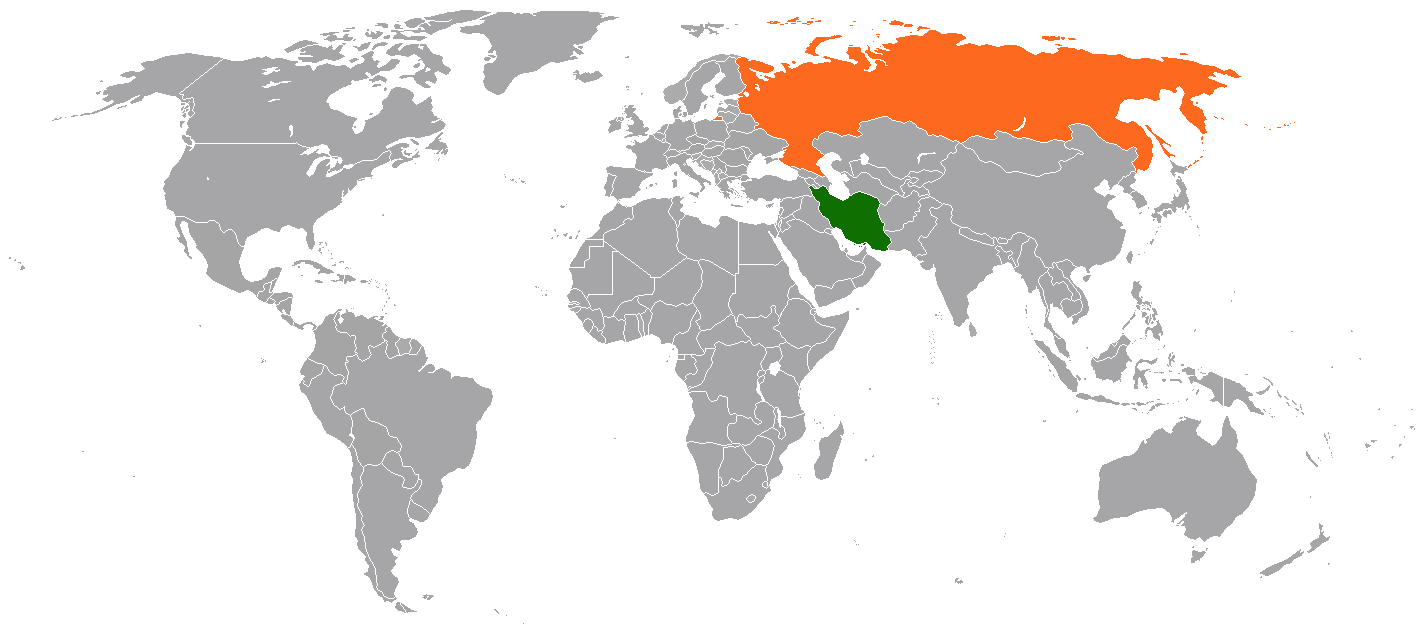

- Iran: Russia

Diplomatic mission
- Embassy of Iran, Moscow: Embassy of Russia, Tehran

Envoy
- Iranian Ambassador to Russia Kazem Jalali: Russian Ambassador to Iran Alexey Dedov

Relations between the Grand Duchy of Moscow and the Safavid Iran officially commenced in 1521, with the Rurikids and Safavids in power respectively. Past and present contact between Russia and Iran have long been complicatedly multi-faceted; often wavering between collaboration and rivalry. The two nations have a long history of geographic, economic, and socio-political interaction. Mutual relations have often been turbulent, and dormant at other times.

Until 1720, on the surface, relations between Iran and Russia were largely friendly and the two operated on a level of equity. After 1720, with Peter the Great's attack on Iran and the establishment of the Russian Empire, the first of a long series of campaigns was initiated against Iran and the Caucasus. The Russian Empire had an oppressive role in Iran during the 19th and early 20th centuries which harmed Iran's development, and during most of the ensuing Soviet period, the shadow of the "big northern neighbour" continued to impend, and the Soviet Union was referred to as "Lesser Satan" by first Iranian supreme leader Ruhollah Khomeini, citing its atheistic communist ideology. However, since the fall of the Soviet Union, the two nations have generally enjoyed very close cordial relations. Iran and Russia are strategic allies and form an axis in the Caucasus alongside Armenia. Iran and Russia are also military allies in the conflicts in Syria, Iraq, and Ukraine; and partners in Afghanistan and post-Soviet Central Asia. Russia is also the chief supplier of arms and weaponry to Iran. Due to international economic sanctions on Iran, Russia has become a key trading partner, especially in regard to the former's excess oil reserves. Currently Russia and Iran share a close economic and military alliance, and both countries are subject to heavy sanctions by most Western nations.

Militarily, Iran is the only country in West Asia that was offered—in 2007—to join the Collective Security Treaty Organization (CSTO), the Russia-based international treaty organization that parallels the North Atlantic Treaty Organization (NATO). As soon as he became president, Vladimir Putin pursued close friendship with Iran and deepened Russian military cooperation with Iran and Syria. In 2015, Putin ordered a military intervention in Syria, supporting the Assad regime and its Iranian allies with an aerial bombing campaign against the Syrian opposition. While much of the Iranian military uses Iranian-manufactured weapons and domestic hardware, Iran still purchases some weapons systems from Russia. In turn, Iran assisted Russia with its drone technology and other military technology during the Russo-Ukrainian war. U.S. government officials and some security scholars believe the two countries have formed a "full-fledged defense partnership".

Iran has its embassy in Moscow and consulates in the cities of Astrakhan and Kazan. Russia has its embassy in Tehran, and consulates in Rasht and Isfahan.

== History ==
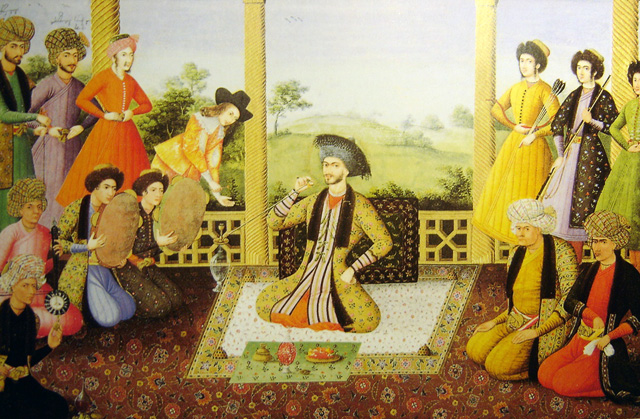
Painting of Shah Suleiman I and his courtiers by Aliquli Jabbadar, Isfahan, 1670. The painting was acquired by Tsar Nicholas II, and is now kept at the Institute of Oriental Manuscripts in Saint Petersburg.

=== Pre-Safavid era ===
Contacts between Russians and Persians have a long history, extending back more than a millennium. There were known commercial exchanges as early as the 8th century AD between Persia and the Rus' principalities. They were interrupted by the Mongol invasions in the 13th and 14th centuries, but started up again in the 15th century with the rise of the state of Muscovy. In the 9th–11th century AD, there were repetitive raiding parties undertaken by the Rus' between 864 and 1041 on the Caspian Sea shores of what is today Iran, Azerbaijan, and Dagestan as part of the Caspian expeditions of the Rus'.

Initially, the Rus' appeared in Serkland during the 9th century, traveling as merchants along the Volga trade route while selling furs, honey, and slaves. The first small-scale raids took place in the late 9th and early 10th century, and the Rus' undertook the first large-scale expedition in 913; having arrived on 500 ships, they pillaged the Gorgan region (within present day Iran), as well the areas of Gilan and Mazandaran, taking slaves and goods.

=== Safavid Empire–Grand Duchy of Muscovy ===
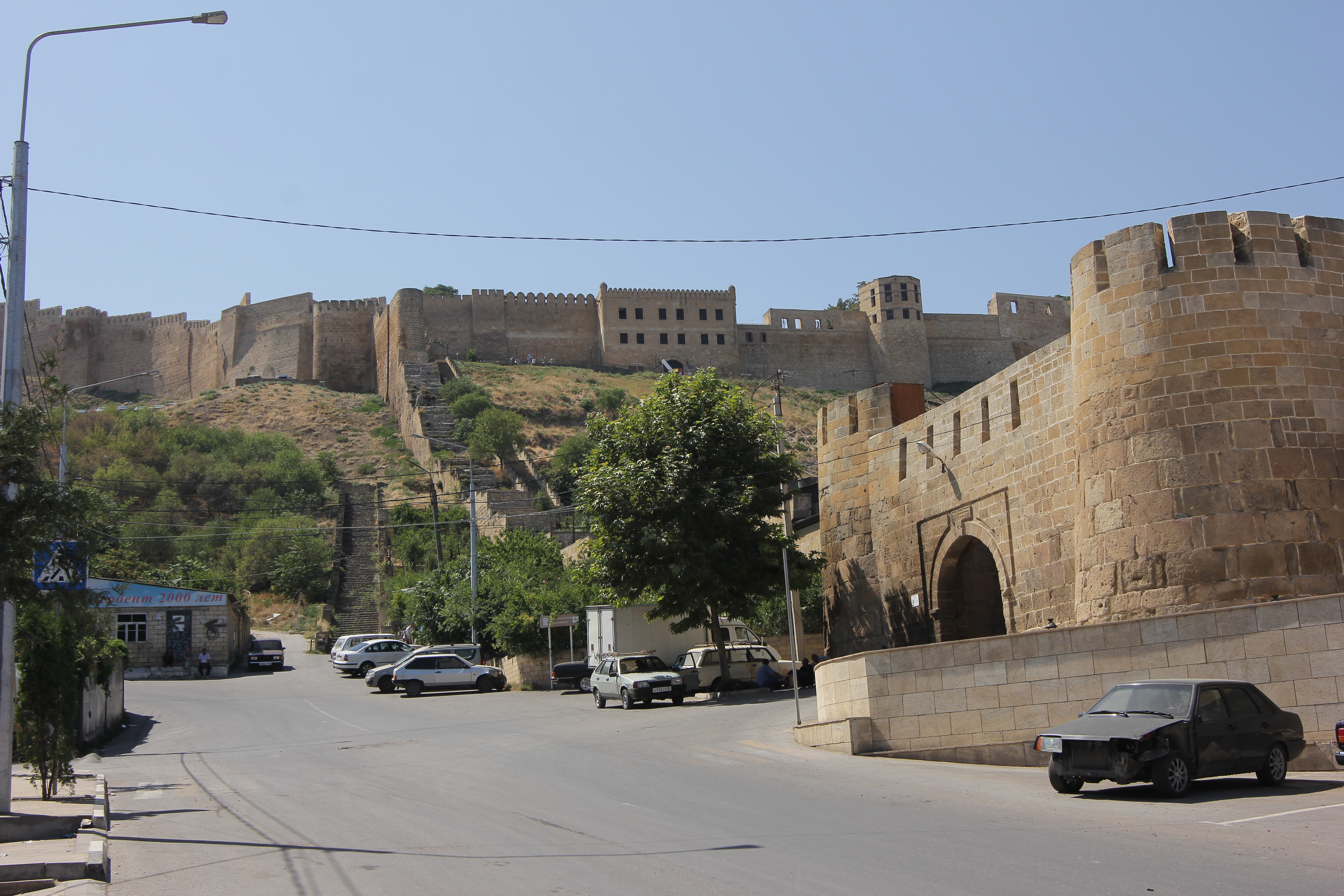
Derbent is renowned for the Sassanid Iranian fortress, a UNESCO World Heritage Site.

It was not until the 16th century that formal diplomatic contacts were established between Persia and the Grand Duchy of Muscovy, with the latter acting as an intermediary in the trade between England and Persia. Transporting goods across Muscovite territory meant that the English could avoid the zones under Ottoman and Portuguese control. The Muscovy Company (also known as the Russian Company) was founded in 1553 to expand the trade routes across the Caspian sea. Moscow's role as an intermediary in exchanges between Britain and Persia led Muscovite traders to set up business in urban centres across Persia, as far south as Kashan. The victories over the Kazan Khanate in 1552 and the Astrakhan Khanate in 1556 by Tsar Ivan IV (r. 1533–84) revived trade between Iran and the Tsardom of Russia via the Volga-Caspian route and marked the first penetration of the Caucasus and the Caspian area by the Tsardom. Though these commercial exchanges in the latter half of the 16th century were limited in scope, they nonetheless indicate that the fledgling entente between the two countries emerged as a result of opposition to the neighboring Ottoman Empire.

Diplomatic relations between the Grand Duchy of Muscovy and Iran date back to 1521, when the Safavid Shah Ismail I sent an emissary to visit the Grand Prince Vasili III. As the first diplomatic contacts between the two countries was being established, Shah Ismail was also working hard with the aim of joining forces against their mutual enemy, neighboring Ottoman Turkey. On several occasions, Iran offered the Grand Duchy of Muscovy a deal exchanging a part of its territory (for example Derbent and Baku in 1586) for its support in its wars against their Ottoman archrivals. In 1552–53, Safavid Iran and the Tsardom of Russia exchanged ambassadors for the first time, and, starting in 1586, they established a regular diplomatic relationship. In 1650, extensive contact between the two people, culminated in the Russo-Persian War (1651–53), after which the Tsardom of Russia had to cede its footholds in the North Caucasus to the Safavids. In the 1660s the famous Russian Cossack ataman Stenka Razin raided, and occasionally wintered at, Persia's north coast, creating diplomatic problems for the Tsar of Russia in his dealings with the Persian Shah. The Russian song telling the tragic semi-legendary story of Razin's relationship with a Persian princess remains popular to this day.

Peace reigned for many decades between the two peoples after these conflicts, in which trade and migration of peoples flourished. The decline of the Safavid and Ottoman state saw the rise of Imperial Russia on the other hand. After the fall of Shah Sultan Husayn brought the Safavid dynasty to an end in 1722, the greatest threats facing Persia were Russian and Ottoman ambitions for territorial expansion in the Caspian region—north-western Persia specifically. During the Safavid period, the power of the Grand Duchy of Muscovy (and later the Tsardom of Russia until 1721) and Persian power was relatively evenly balanced, though after Peter the Great proclaimed the Russian Empire in 1721, this balance began to shift.

=== Russian Empire ===
Overall, the common anti-Ottoman struggle served as the main common political interest for Iran and the Grand Duchy of Muscovy (later the Tsardom of Russia, and then the Russian Empire) throughout the period of Safavid rule, with several attempts to conclude an anti-Ottoman military treaty. Following Shah Husayn's fall, the relationship lost its symmetry, but it was largely restored under Nader Shah.

In his later years of rule, Peter the Great found himself in a strong enough position to increase Russian influence more southwards in the Caucasus, the Caspian Sea and the Black Sea, challenging both the Safavids and the Ottomans. He made the city of Astrakhan his base for his hostilities against Persia, created a shipyard, and attacked the weakened Safavids in the Russo-Persian War (1722–1723), capturing many of its territories in the Caucasus and northern mainland Iran for several years. After several years of political chaos in Persia following the fall of the Safavids, a new and powerful Persian empire was born under the highly successful military leader Nader Shah. Fearing a costly war which would most likely be lost against Nader and also being flanked by the Turks in the west, the Russians were forced to give back all territories and retreat from the entire Caucasus and northern mainland Iran as according to the Treaty of Resht (1732) and Treaty of Ganja (1735) during the reign of Anna of Russia. The terms of the treaty also included the first instance of close Russo-Iranian collaboration against a common enemy, in this case the Ottoman Turks. Relations sooned soured, however, after Nader Shah accused the Russians of conspiring against him. The invasion of Dagestan in 1741 was partially directed against Russia; thus the Terek River was left on a high state of alert until Nader Shah's death.

Karim Khan Zand promised the Russians certain territories in the northern frontier if they helped him against enemies like the Ottomans.

=== Qajar Persia–Russian Empire ===
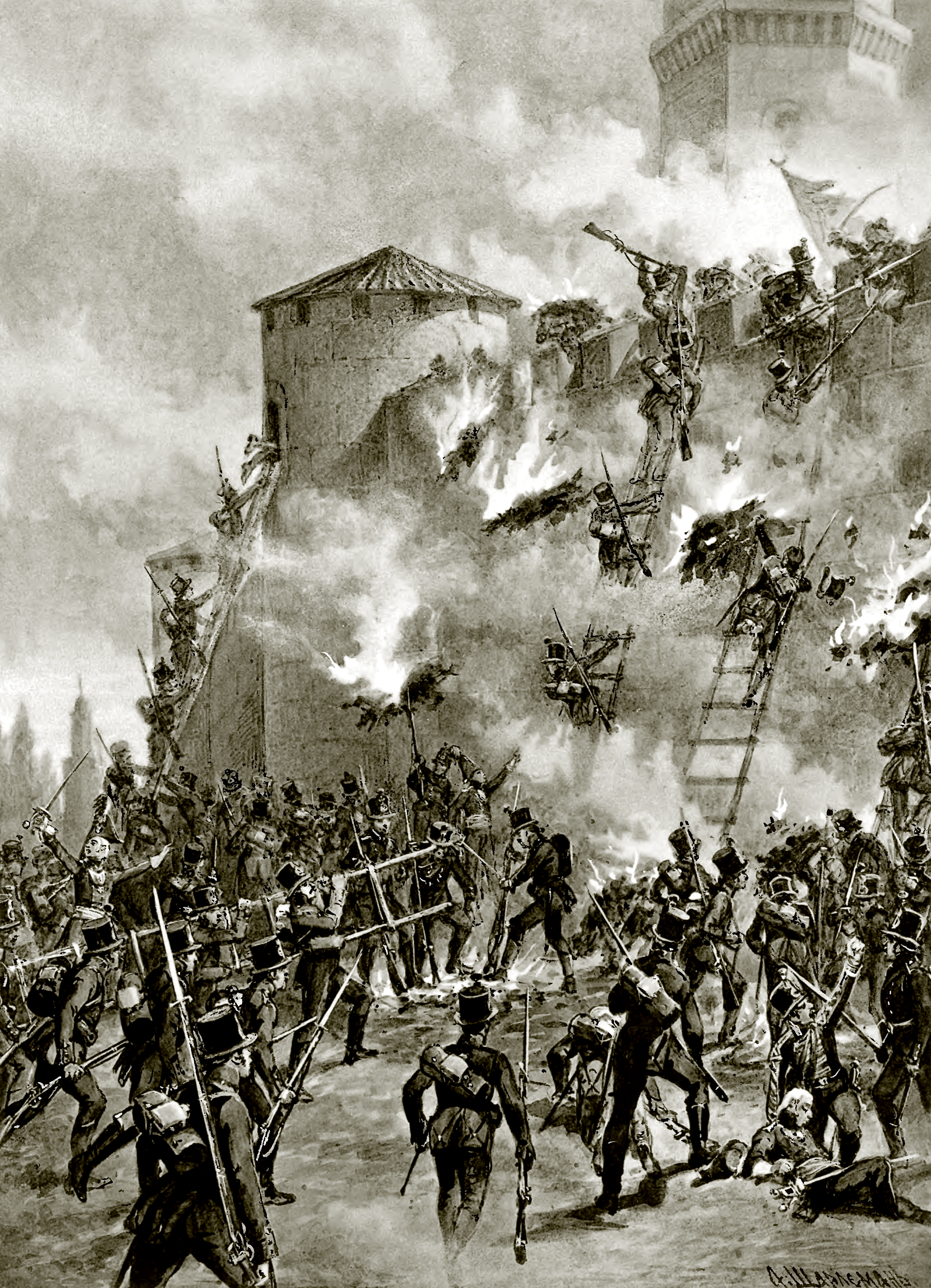
The Battle of Ganja (1804) during the Russo-Persian War (1804–1813).

Iranian-Russian relations particularly picked up again following the death of Nader Shah and the dissolution of his Afsharid dynasty which gave eventually way to the Qajarid dynasty in the mid-18th century. The first Qajar Persian ambassador to Russia was Mirza Abolhassan Khan Ilchi. After the rule of Agha Mohammad Khan, who stabilized the nation and re-established Iranian suzerainty in the Caucasus, the Qajarid government was quickly absorbed with managing domestic turmoil, while rival colonial powers rapidly sought a stable foothold in the region. While the Portuguese, British, and Dutch competed for the south and southeast of Persia in the Persian Gulf, the Russian Empire largely was left unchallenged in the north as it plunged southward to establish dominance in Persia's northern territories. Plagued with internal politics, the Qajarid government found itself incapable of rising to the challenge of facing its northern threat from Russia.

A weakened and bankrupted royal court, under Fath Ali Shah, was forced to sign the notoriously unfavourable Treaty of Gulistan (1813) following the outcome of the Russo-Persian War (1804–1813), irrevocably ceding what is modern-day Dagestan, Georgia, and large parts of the Republic of Azerbaijan. The Treaty of Turkmenchay (1828) was the outcome of the Russo-Persian War (1826–1828), which resulted in the loss of modern-day Armenia and the remainder of the Azerbaijan Republic, and granted Russia several highly beneficial capitulatory rights, after efforts and initial success by Abbas Mirza failed to ultimately secure Persia's northern front. By these two treaties, Iran lost swaths of its integral territories that had made part of the concept of Iran for centuries. The area to the north of the Aras River, which included the territories of the contemporary nations of Georgia, Azerbaijan, Armenia and the North Caucasian Republic of Dagestan, were Iranian territory until they were occupied by Russia in the course of the 19th century. Russia more or less openly pursued a policy to free their newly conquered land from Iran's influence. By doing this, the Russian government helped to create and spread a new Turkic identity that, in contrast to the previous one, was founded on secular principles, particularly the shared language. As a result, many Iranian-speaking residents of the future Azerbaijan Republic at the time either started hiding their Iranian ancestry or underwent progressive assimilation. The Tats and Kurds underwent these integration processes particularly quickly.

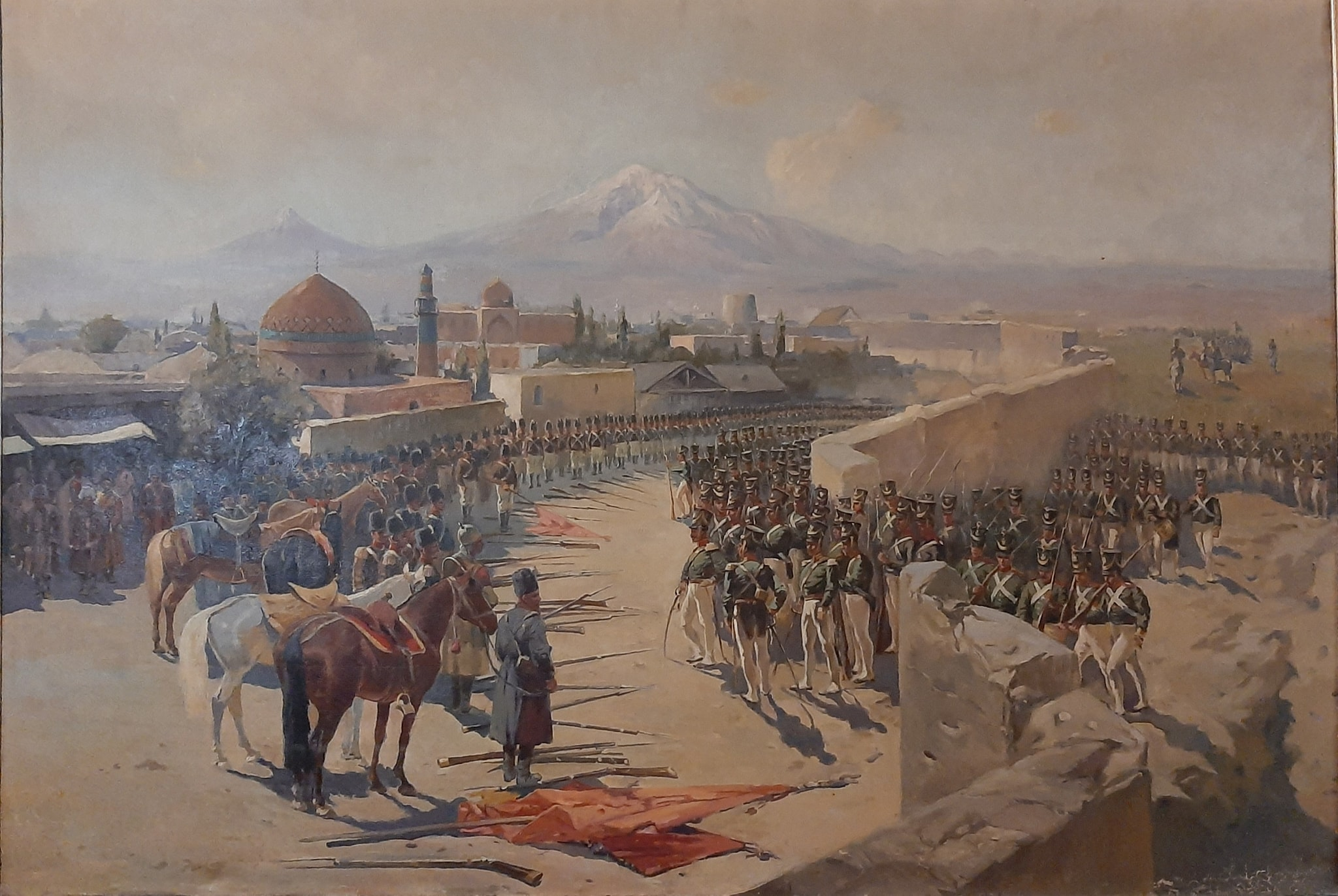
Painting of the Capture of Erivan during the Russo-Persian War of 1826–28

Anti-Russian sentiment was so high in Persia during that time that uprisings in numerous cities were formed. The famous Russian intellectual, ambassador to Persia, and Alexander Pushkin's best friend, Alexander Griboyedov, was killed along with hundreds of Cossacks by angry mobs in Tehran during these uprisings.

With the Russian Empire still advancing south in the course of two wars against Persia, and the treaties of Turkmanchay and Golestan in the western frontiers, plus the unexpected death of Abbas Mirza in 1823, and the murder of Persia's Grand Vizier (Abol-Qasem Qa'em-Maqam), Persia lost its traditional foothold in Central Asia. The Treaty of Akhal, in which the Qajarid's were forced to drop all claims on Central Asia and parts of Turkmenistan, topped off Persian losses to the global emerging power of Imperial Russia.

In the same period, by a proposal of the Shah with the backing of the Tsar, the Russians founded the Persian Cossack Brigade, which and would prove to be crucial in the next few decades of Iranian history and Irano-Russian relations. The Persian Cossacks were organized along Russian lines and controlled by Russian officers. They dominated Tehran and most northern centers of living. The Russians also organized a banking institution in Iran, which they established in 1890.

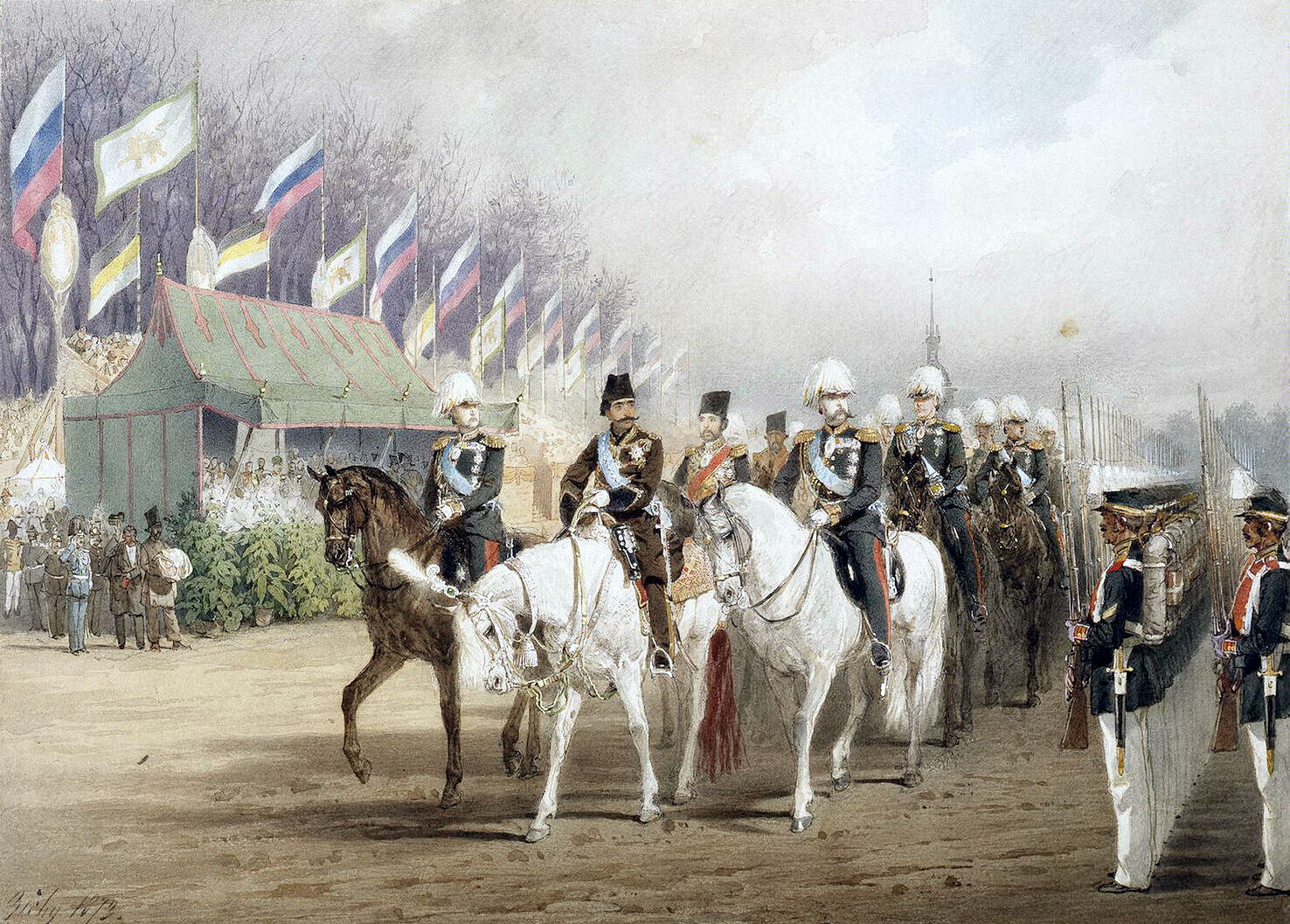
Alexander II of Russia and Naser al-Din Shah Qajar in Saint Petersburg, 1873

During the 19th century, Russians dealt with Iran as an inferior "Orient", and held its people in contempt whilst ridiculing all aspects of Iranian culture. The Russian version of contemporaneous Western attitudes of superiority differed however. As Russian national identity was divided between East and West and Russian culture held many Asian elements, Russians consequently felt equivocal and even inferior to Western Europeans. In order to stem the tide of this particular inferiority complex, they tried to overcompensate to Western European powers by overemphasizing their own Europeanness and Christian faith, and by expressing scornfully their low opinion of Iranians. The historian Elena Andreeva adds that this trend was not only very apparent in over 200 Russian travelogues written about Iran and published in the course of the 19th and early 20th centuries, but also in diplomatic and other official documents.

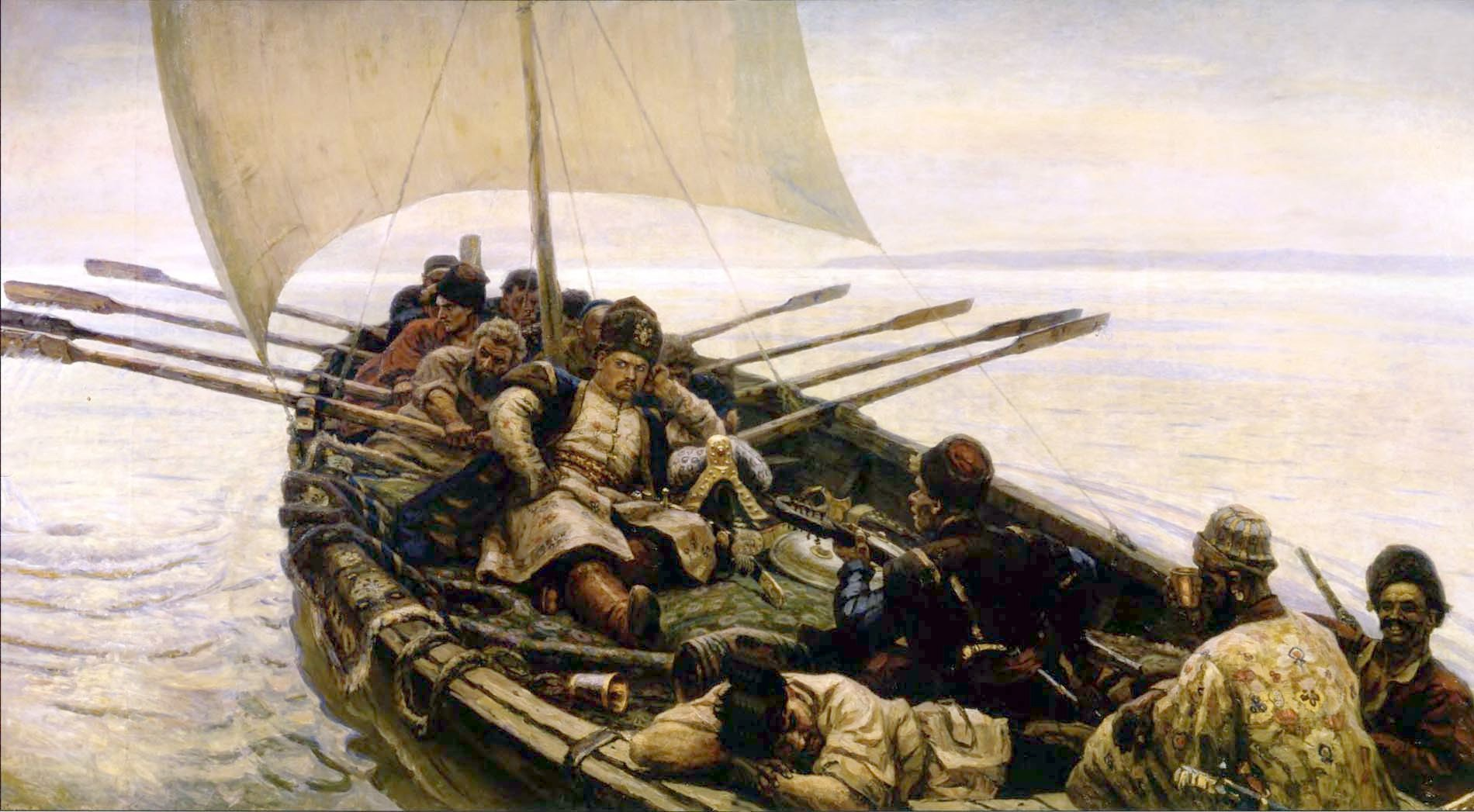
Stepan Razin Sailing in the Caspian Sea by Vasily Surikov, 1906

In 1907, Russia and Britain divided Iran into three segments that served their mutual interests, in the Anglo-Russian Convention of 1907. The Russians gained control over the northern areas of Iran, which included the cities of Tabriz, Tehran, Mashad, and Isfahan. The British were given the southeastern region and control of the Persian Gulf, and the territory between the two regions was classified as neutral territory.

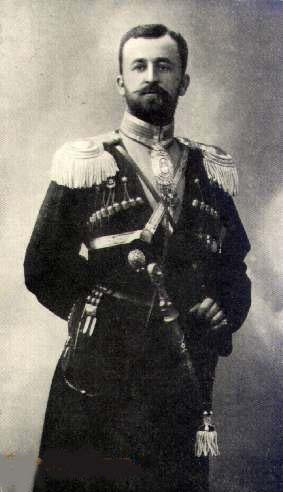
Colonel V. Liakhov was notorious for shelling the National Iranian Assembly in 1911.

Russia's influence in northern Iran was paramount from the signing of the Anglo-Russian Convention of 1907 until the outbreak of World War I in 1914. During this time period, it stationed troops in Iran's Gilan, Azerbaijan and Khorasan provinces, and its diplomatic offices (consulates) in these parts wieleded considerable power. These consulates dominated the local Iranian administration and in some circumstances even collected local taxes. Starting in the same year as the Anglo-Russian Convention, unpremeditated Russian colonization commenced in Mazandaran and Astarabad provinces. Then, in 1912, Russian foreign policy officially adopted the plan to colonize northern Iran. At the outbreak of World War I, there were most likely some 4,000 Russian settlers in Astarabad and Mazandaran, whereas in northeastern Iran the Russians had founded a minimum of 15 Russian villages.

During the reign of Nicholas II of Russia, Russian occupational troops played a major role in the attempted Tsarist suppression of the Iranian Constitutional Revolution. In the dawn of the outbreak of World War I, Russian occupational forces occupied Qajar Iran's Azerbaijan province as well as the entire north and north-east of the country, and amounted to circa twenty thousand. Following the start of the Persian Campaign of World War I, the number of Russian troops in Iran moderately grew to some eighty or ninety thousand.

As a result of the major Anglo-Russian influence in Iran, at a high point, the central government in Tehran was left with no power to even select its own ministers without the approval of the Anglo-Russian consulates. Morgan Shuster, for example, had to resign under British and Russian diplomatic pressure on the Persian government. Shuster's book The Strangling of Persia: Story of the European Diplomacy and Oriental Intrigue That Resulted in the Denationalization of Twelve Million Mohammedans is an account of this period, criticizing the policies of Russian and Britain in Iran.

These, and a series of climaxing events such as the Russian shelling of Mashad's Goharshad Mosque in 1911, and the shelling of the Persian National Assembly by the Russian Colonel V. Liakhov, led to a surge in widespread anti-Russian sentiments across the nation.

=== Pahlavi–Soviet Union ===
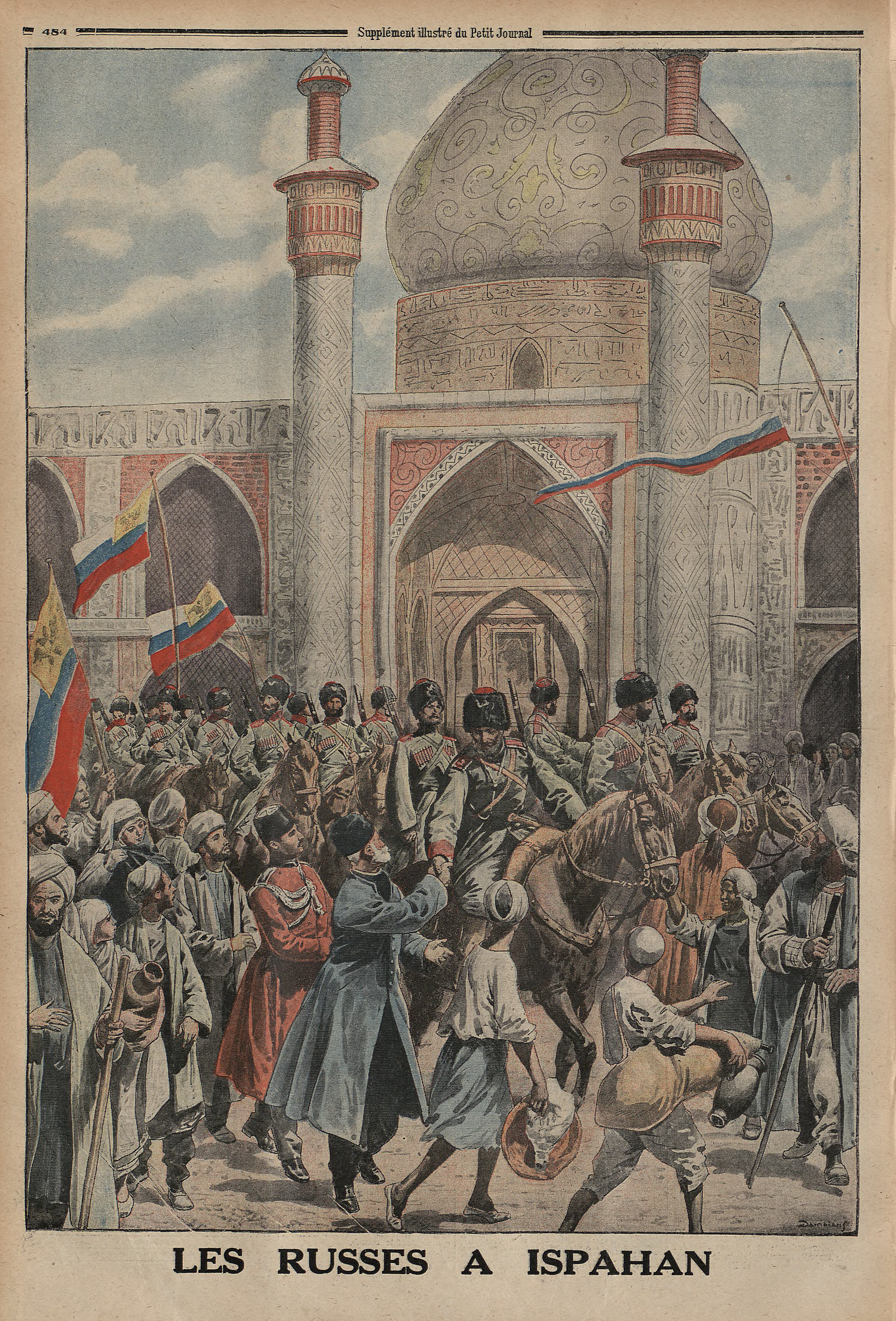
Image from 1916 French magazine showing the "Russians at Isfahan".

After the Russian Revolution of March 1917, the imperial army of the Czar collapsed, leading to the emergence of nationalist and socialist movements in Iran's northern regions. The Bolshevik Revolution in November had a comparable effect throughout Iran. One result of the public outcry against the ubiquitous presence of Imperial Russia in Persia was the Constitutionalist movement of Gilan, which followed up the Iranian Constitutional Revolution. Many participants of the revolution were Iranians educated in the Caucasus, direct émigrés (also called Caucasian muhajirs) from the Caucasus, as well as Armenians that at the same period were busy with establishing the Dashnaktsutyun party as well as operations directed against the neighboring Ottoman Empire. The rebellion in Gilan, headed by Mirza Kuchak Khan led to an eventual confrontation between the Iranian rebels and the Russian army, but was disrupted with the October Revolution in 1917.

As a result of the October Revolution, thousands of Russians fled the country, many to Persia. Many of these refugees settled in northern Persia creating their own communities of which many of their descendants still populate the country. Some notable descendants of these Russian refugees in Persia include the political activist and writer Marina Nemat and the former general and deputy chief of the Imperial Iranian Air Force Nader Jahanbani, whose mother was a White émigré.

Russian involvement however continued on with the establishment of the short-lived Persian Socialist Soviet Republic in 1920, supported by Azeri and Caucasian Bolshevik leaders. After the fall of this republic, in late 1921, political and economic relations were renewed. In the 1920s, trade between the Soviet Union and Persia reached again important levels. Baku played a particularly significant role as the venue for a trade fair between the USSR and the Middle East, notably Persia.

In 1921, Britain and the new Bolshevik government entered into an agreement that reversed the division of Iran made in 1907. The Bolsheviks returned all the territory back to Iran, and Iran once more had secured navigation rights on the Caspian Sea. This agreement to evacuate from Iran was made in the Russo-Persian Treaty of Friendship (1921), but the regaining of Iranian territory did not protect the Qajar dynasty from a sudden coup d'état led by Colonel Reza Shah.

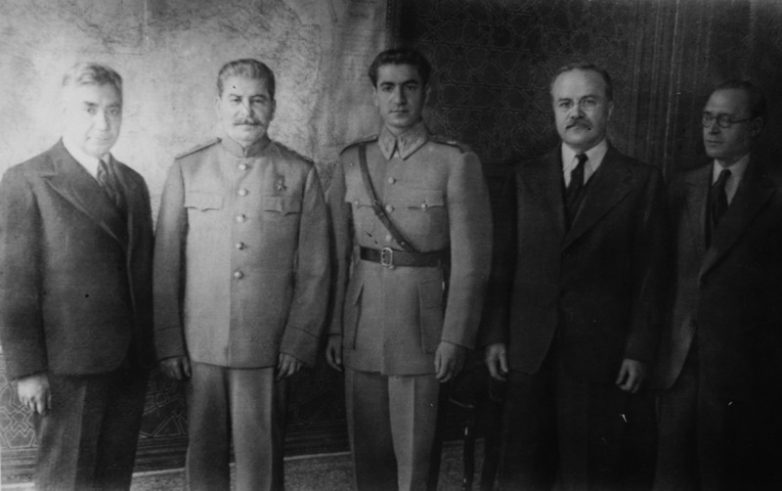
Young Mohammad Reza Shah (centre), pictured between Joseph Stalin and Vyacheslav Molotov at the Tehran Conference in 1943

In the 1920s-1930s, the Soviet secret service (Cheka-OGPU-NKVD) carried out clandestine operations on Iranian soil as it tried to eliminate White émigrées that had moved to Iran. In 1941, as the Second World War raged, the Soviet Union and the United Kingdom launched an undeclared joint invasion of Iran, ignoring its plea of neutrality.

In a revealing cable sent on July 6, 1945, by the Central Committee of the Communist Party of the Soviet Union, the local Soviet commander in northern Azerbaijan was instructed as such:

"Begin preparatory work to form a national autonomous Azerbaijan district with broad powers within the Iranian state and simultaneously develop separatist movements in the provinces of Gilan, Mazandaran, Gorgan, and Khorasan".

After the end of the war, the Soviets supported two newly formed puppet states in Iran, the Azerbaijan People's Government and the Republic of Mahabad, but both collapsed in the Iran crisis of 1946. This postwar confrontation brought the United States fully into Iran's political arena and, with Cold War starting, the US quickly moved to convert Iran into an anti-communist ally.

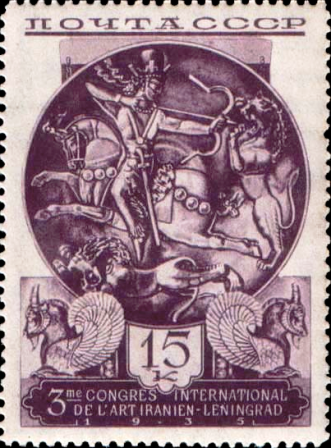
1935 USSR stamp marking the 3rd International Congress of Iranian Art, held in Leningrad

=== Islamic Republic of Iran–Soviet Union ===
The Soviet Union was the first state to recognize the Islamic Republic of Iran, in February 1979. During the Iran–Iraq War (1980-1988), however, it supplied Iraqi leader Saddam Hussein with large amounts of conventional arms, ostensibly standing in opposition to the Iranian regime. As Iran considered attacking Iraq in July 1982, the Soviet Union warned against it. At the UN Security Council, the USSR voted for a resolution calling for a ceasefire and a return to international borders. Supreme Leader Ayatollah Khomeini deemed Islam principally incompatible with the communist ideals (such as atheism) of the Soviet Union, calling it the "Lesser Satan" and rejecting alignment with either side in the Cold War between the US and the USSR. During the early years of the Iran–Iraq War, the USSR supplied Iraq with most of its weaponry, while Iran backed select elements of the Afghan mujahideen in their war against the Soviets. However, later the USA imposed an arms embargo on Iran, and the Soviet Union began to supply arms to Iran via North Korea.

After the war, in 1989, Iran made an arms deal with the Soviet Union. The military agreement allowed Iran to acquire advanced Russian aircraft, including MIG-29s and SU-24s. Iran urgently needed such equipment, as its air force had been severely depleted by the eight-year war with Iraq and was unable to obtain spare parts or new aircraft from the United States.

Iranian Supreme Leader Khomeini died in 1989 and was succeeded by Ali Khamenei.

=== Islamic Republic of Iran–Russian Federation ===
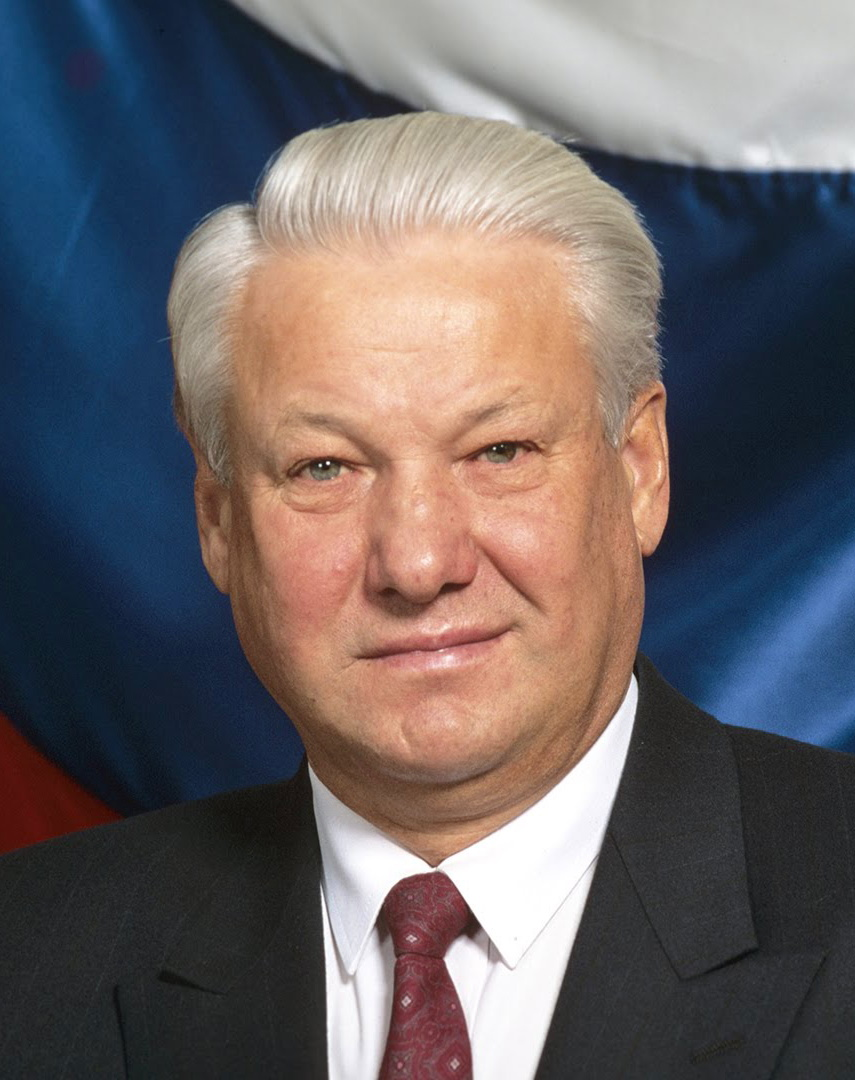
Russian president Boris Yeltsin

After the USSR collapsed in December 1991, Boris Yeltsin—already president of the Russian Soviet Federative Socialist Republic—became the first president of the Russian Federation, holding the position until 1999.

Under Yeltsin, Russia viewed Iran as a key market for arms and nuclear technology, and as a means to assert foreign policy independence from the United States. Ties deepened after the Gulf War in 1990–1991, as Iran, facing a stronger U.S. military presence in the region through Gulf Cooperation Council alliances, increasingly relied on Russian military support. Russia inherited Soviet-era arms deals and agreed by the mid-1990s to develop Iran's nuclear program with plans to resume work on Iran's long-delayed nuclear reactor plant at Bushehr. The two countries also cooperated in countering Turkish influence in Central Asia and the Caucasus, and restraining Azerbaijani nationalism. Meanwhile, Iran benefited from Russian diplomatic support amid U.S.-led efforts to isolate it.

Although Yeltsin initially sought closer ties with the United States, domestic critics pressured him to demonstrate independence. He pointed to Russia's 1993 nuclear reactor deal with Iran as evidence of an autonomous foreign policy. This deal drew U.S. criticism over proliferation risks, which Russia also sought to avoid, leading Yeltsin to cancel a proposed transfer of centrifuge technology.

By 1995, both countries were describing their growing ties as strategic. With the First Chechen War and looming NATO expansion, Russian nationalists saw Iran as a counterweight to Western influence. A cooperative Iran was also seen as a way to prevent support for insurgents in Russia's south. In March 1996, Iranian Foreign Minister Ali Akbar Velayati visited Moscow and declared bilateral ties at a historic high. Both countries opposed NATO enlargement and expanded military and economic cooperation. Reports suggested Russia was ready to sell Iran $4 billion in arms and equipment between 1997 and 2007, pending financial guarantees.

Iran and Russia shared an interest in opposing the Taliban, whose takeover of Afghanistan in 1996 threatened regional stability. Concerns over extremism and drug trafficking led to deeper cooperation, including a 1999 agreement to combat narcotics. Their joint efforts during the civil war in Tajikistan also helped solidify relations.
Both Iran and Russia viewed "Turkey's regional ambitions and the possible spread of some form of pan-Turkic ideology with suspicion".

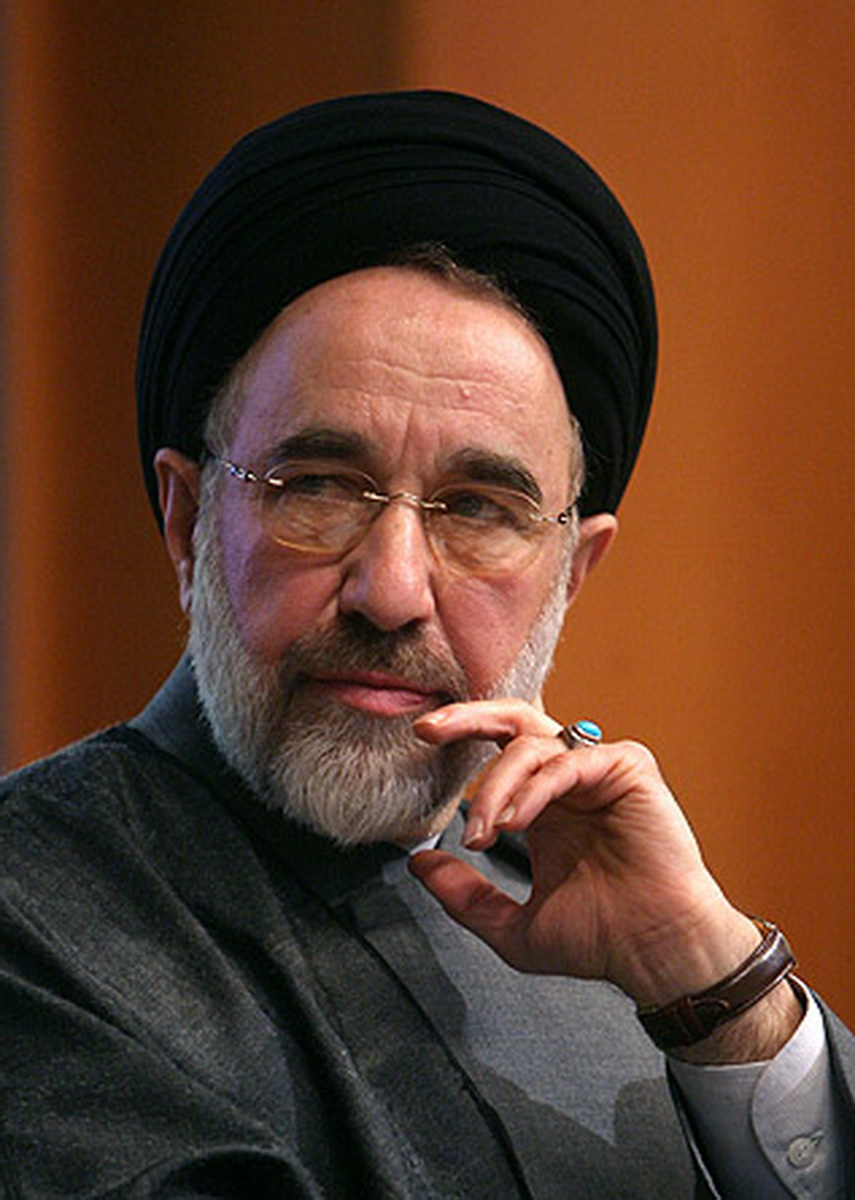
Iranian president Mohammad Khatami

In May 1997, Mohammad Khatami was elected president of Iran on a moderate platform of social and democratic reform, and economic change. His election briefly raised hopes of a U.S.–Iran thaw, but the initiative stalled by mid-1998 due domestic opposition in Iran. Russian policymakers feared losing influence if Iran reoriented toward the West. Despite U.S. pressure over missile and nuclear cooperation, Russia prioritized its strategic ties with Iran—most notably through the Bushehr reactor—while managing tensions with the U.S.

Russia and Iran deepened their cooperation in 1999 to counter Western-backed energy projects like the Baku-Ceyhan and Trans-Caspian pipelines. Though their long-term Caspian interests diverged, they worked together to block rival projects and assert regional influence.

Despite strong ties, the Second Chechen War strained the relationship. Iran, then leading the Organization of the Islamic Conference, faced pressure to denounce Russia's brutal conduct in Chechnya, but it tried to balance Islamic solidarity with its strategic alliance with Russia. Iran criticized Russian actions and sent aid to Chechen refugees, while Russia accused Iran of backing rebels but tolerated limited OIC involvement. Both sides downplayed the tensions, but the war marked the start of a gradual cooling in relations.

== Khamenei–Putin era ==
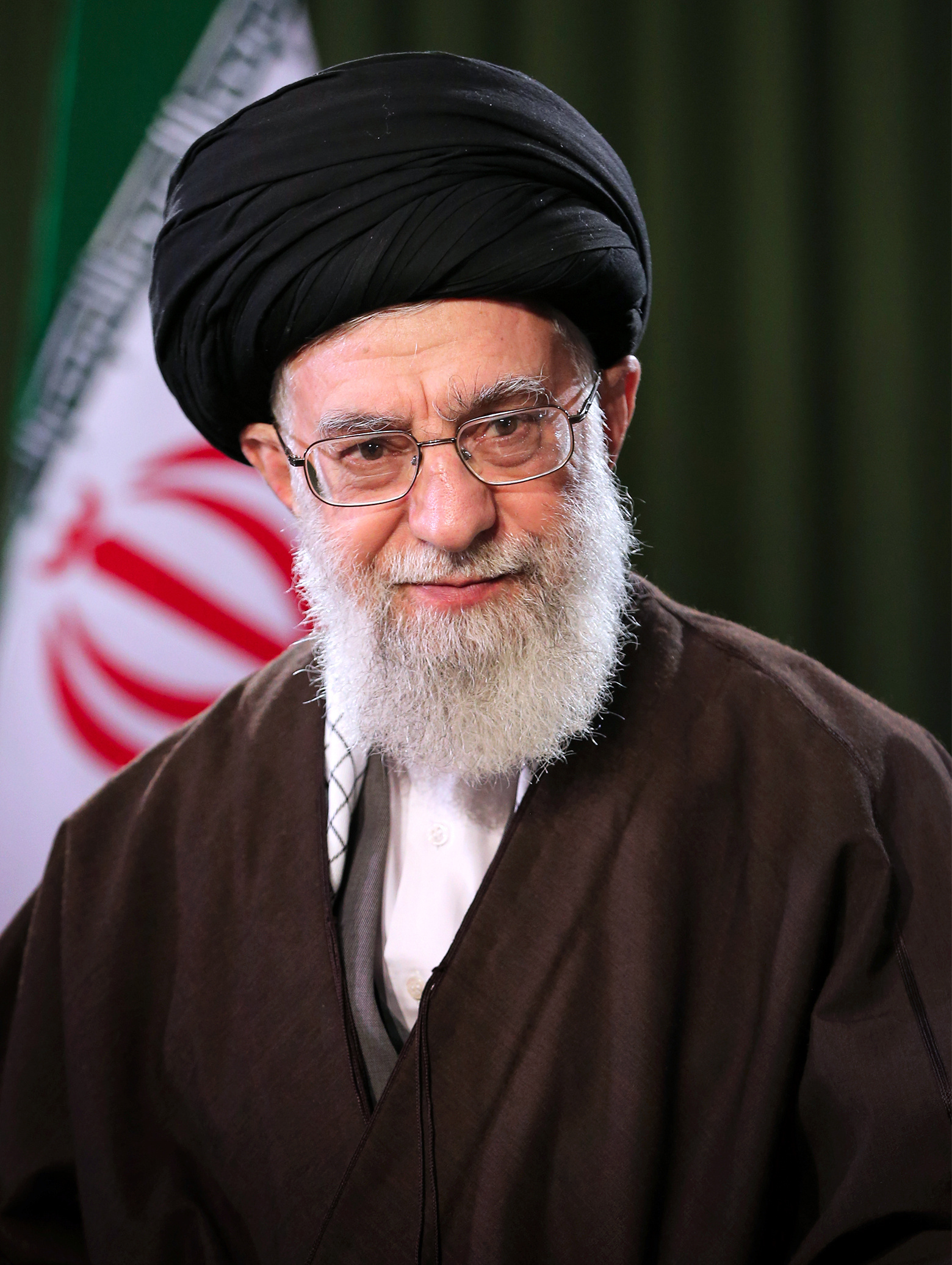
Ali Khamenei

Vladimir Putin

Vladimir Putin was elected president of Russia in March 2000 and inaugurated on 7 May that year. The Iranian government's decision to reorient its foreign policy toward the East, combined with the unilateral sanctions imposed by the United States, has led to increased cooperation between Iran and Russia.

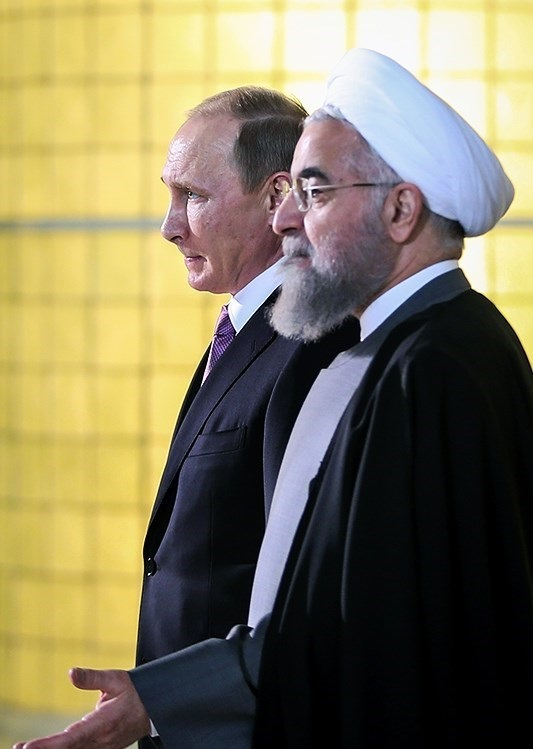
Hassan Rouhani and Vladimir Putin in Tehran, 20 November 2015

In March 2001, President Putin hosted Iranian president Khatami in Moscow, where the two leaders signed the Treaty on the Basic Elements of Relations and the Principles of Cooperation. Although the treaty did not redefine the relationship as a strategic partnership, the summit underscored warming ties and coincided with Russia's withdrawal from the Gore-Chernomyrdin Commission, a U.S. and Russian agreement to increase cooperation between the two countries in several different areas. This paved the way for future arms deals reportedly worth $7 billion.

=== Military and security cooperation ===
Prior to the Iranian Revolution, Iran's air fleet was entirely Western-made, but by the early 2000s, its Air Force and civilian air fleet were increasingly becoming domestically and Russian-built, as the U.S. and Europe continued to maintain sanctions on Iran. Between 2000 and 2007, Russia became Iran's primary arms supplier, accounting for approximately 85% of the country's total military imports. During this period, Iran ranked as the third-largest recipient of Russian weapons, with deliveries valued at $1.96 billion—equivalent to 5.4% of Russia's total military exports.

In May 2007 Iran was invited to join the Collective Security Treaty Organization (CSTO), the Russia-based international treaty organization that parallels NATO. The invitation came from the desk of then CSTO secretary-general Nikolai Bordyuzha, who said that "the CSTO is an open organization. If Iran applies in accordance with our charter, we will consider the application." It was stated by a Western observer that the accession failed "basically due to the ayatollahs’ opposition to join a military bloc clearly dominated by a traditionally rival power of Iran such as Russia." Another Western observer points out that, like NATO, CSTO has a mutual defense treaty clause whereby attack against one is considered an attack against all and was concerned about the difficulty posed by a possible conflagration of the Iran-Israel variety. Iran never joined. In November 2014 Sluzhba Vneshney Razvedki head Sergey Naryshkin floated the idea of admitting Iran as an observer to the CSTO Parliamentary Assembly.

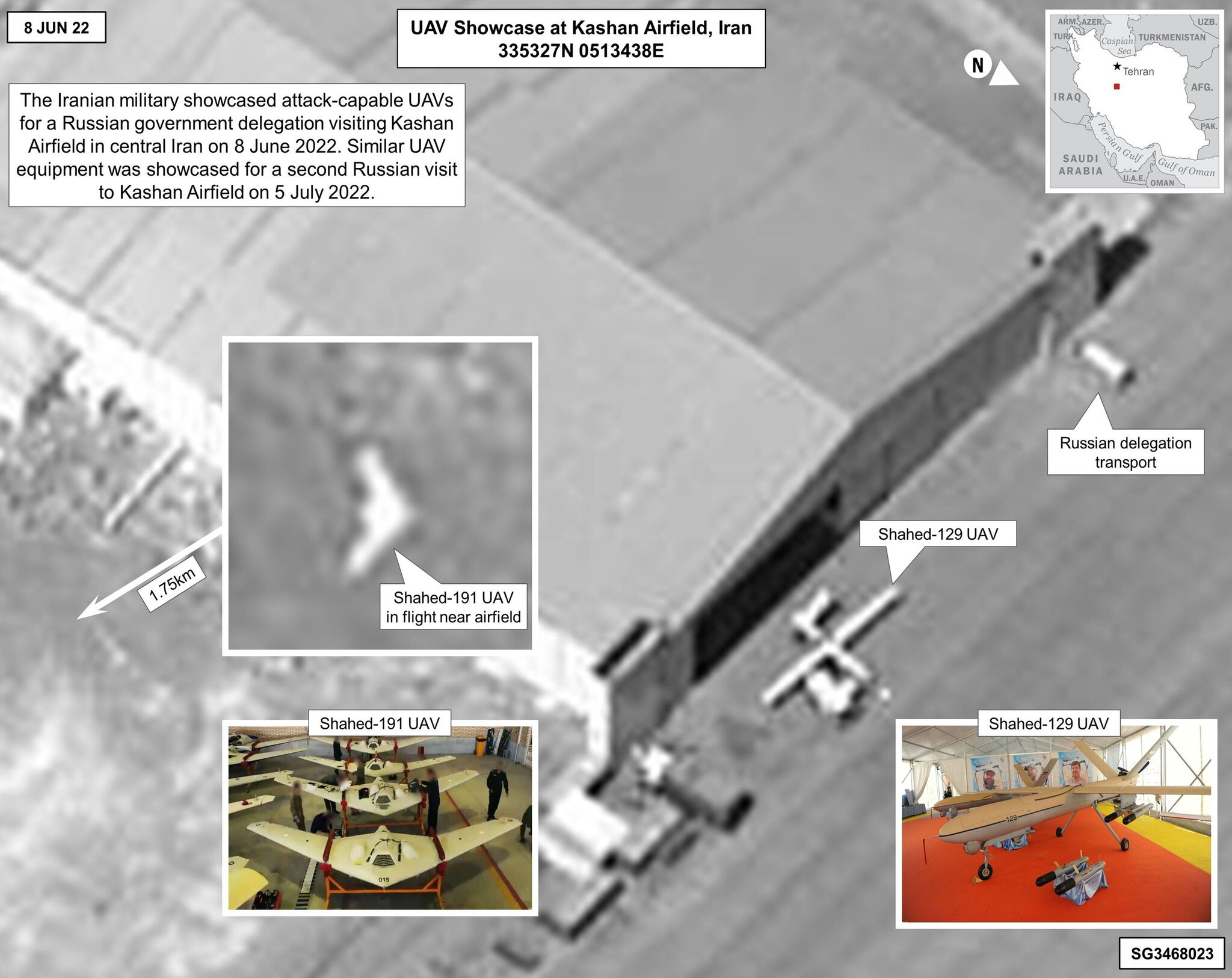
Russian delegation viewing Iranian drones, including the Shahed 129 and the Shahed Saegheh, at Kashan Airfield in June 2022 during the Russo-Ukrainian War

In 2010, Iran's refusal to halt its uranium enrichment program led the UN to pass United Nations Security Council Resolution 1929, which imposed a new round of sanctions banning the sale of all types of heavy weaponry to Iran, including missiles. Russia voted in favour of the resolution. This resulted in the cancellation of the planned sale of the S-300 system to Iran in September 2010, and Russian president Dmitry Medvedev subsequently signed a decree banning the further delivery of armored vehicles, warplanes, helicopters, and ships to Iran. In response to the cancellation, Iran filed a lawsuit against Russia in a Swiss court in 2012.

Since the outbreak of the Syrian Civil War in 2011, Iran and Russia became the principal allies of president Bashar al-Assad's government, openly providing it with military support. Following the 2015 JCPOA agreement, Russian president Vladimir Putin lifted the ban on the S-300, reviving Iran's missile defense system. Russia completed delivery of the four S-300 batteries to Iran in November 2016. This sale was reported to be followed by a $10 billion deal that included helicopters, planes and artillery systems. However, an editorial analysis from 2022 found such a deal highly unlikely, citing the implausibility of key elements such as Iran paying oil-rich Russia in crude, inflated cost estimates, and the alleged reassignment of Su-35s originally intended for Egypt. The analysis also questioned Iran's financial and logistical capacity to integrate such advanced hardware, noting its past difficulties with cheaper alternatives.

Meanwhile, Russia's own relations with the West plummeted due to the Russo-Ukrainian War, the 2018 Skripal poisoning incident in Great Britain, and alleged Russian interference with Western politics, prompting the U.S. and Europe to retaliate with sanctions against Russia. As a result, Russia has shown a degree of willingness to deepen its military ties with Iran.

In January 2021 Iran, China and Russia held their third joint naval exercise, the third joint exercise of the three countries, in the northern Indian Ocean and the Sea of Oman area. The joint exercise of the three countries began in 2019 in the Indian Ocean.

In early 2024, amid concerns of vastly increased military engagement between the two partners, rumours abounded that Russia had sold to Iran their Su-35 platform. This followed a 2023 report that the partners had finalized a deal for Su-35, Mi-28 and Yak-130.

In July 2026, Russian President Vladimir Putin, during a meeting with officers of the Russian Navy, commended the operational effectiveness of Iran’s so‑called “mosquito fleet” in the context of ongoing conflicts in the Middle East. He stated that Iran had demonstrated considerable efficiency in its naval engagements through the use of such small, fast‑attack craft, and attributed this performance to the employment of modern naval technologies. Putin further noted that Russia is actively developing analogous capabilities, pointing to the construction of small‑displacement vessels armed with Kalibr cruise missiles as a domestic example. He emphasized that such platforms are capable of delivering accurate and high‑impact strikes against adversary targets.

In September 2026, an investigation by the Financial Times reported that Russia had covertly assisted Iran since 2023 in developing supersonic cruise missiles intended to threaten American warships in the Middle East. According to the report, the programme, codenamed C340L, was designed to help Iran develop a ramjet propulsion system, enabling a cruise missile to sustain flight at several times the speed of sound. Missiles and military experts cited by the Financial Times said the technology was almost certainly intended for anti-ship and land-attack cruise missiles.

==== Russo-Ukrainian war (2022–present) ====
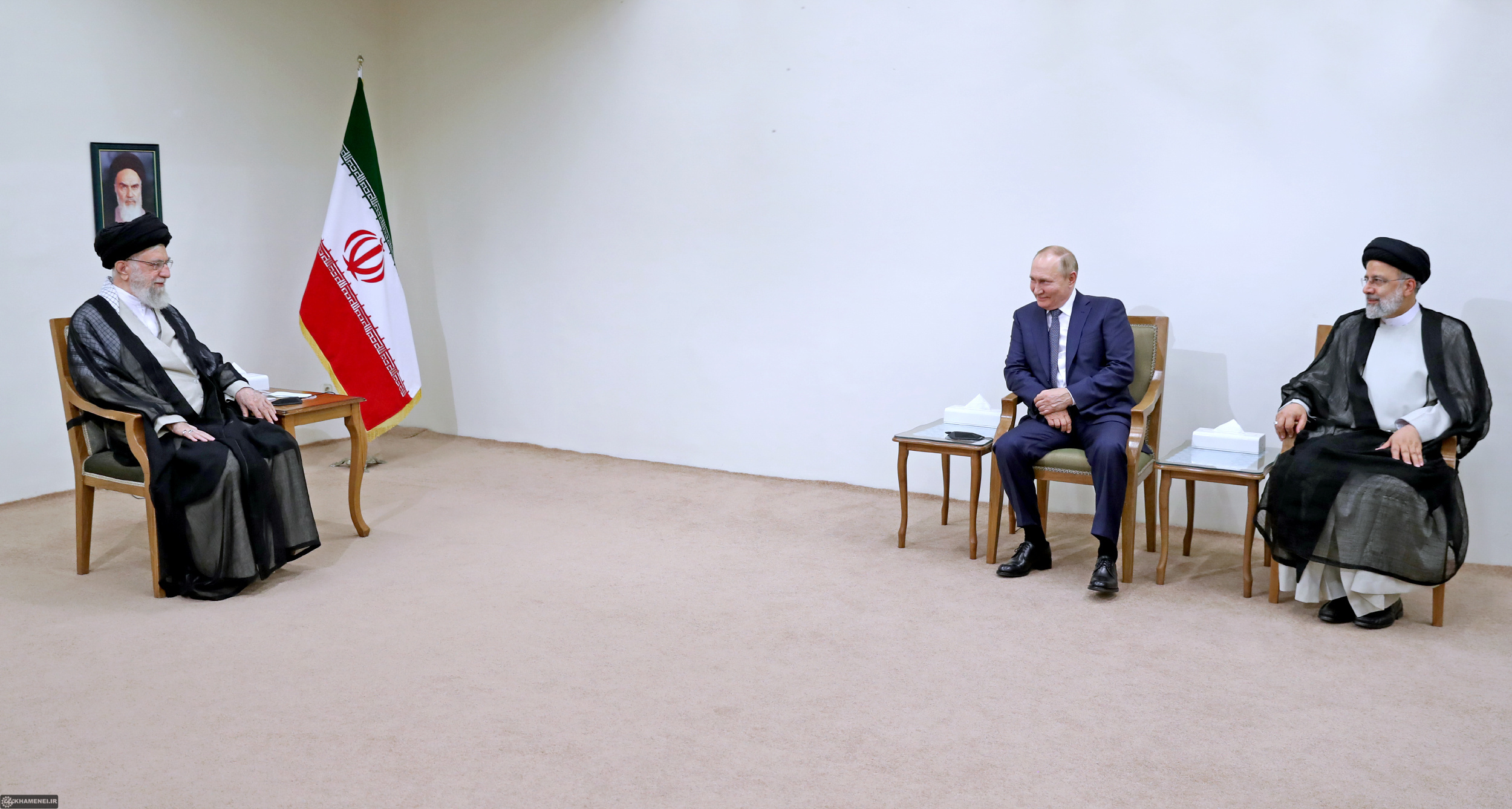
Russian President Vladimir Putin (right) meeting with Iranian Supreme Leader Ali Khamenei (left) and former Iranian president Ebrahim Raisi (far right) in Tehran, 19 July 2022

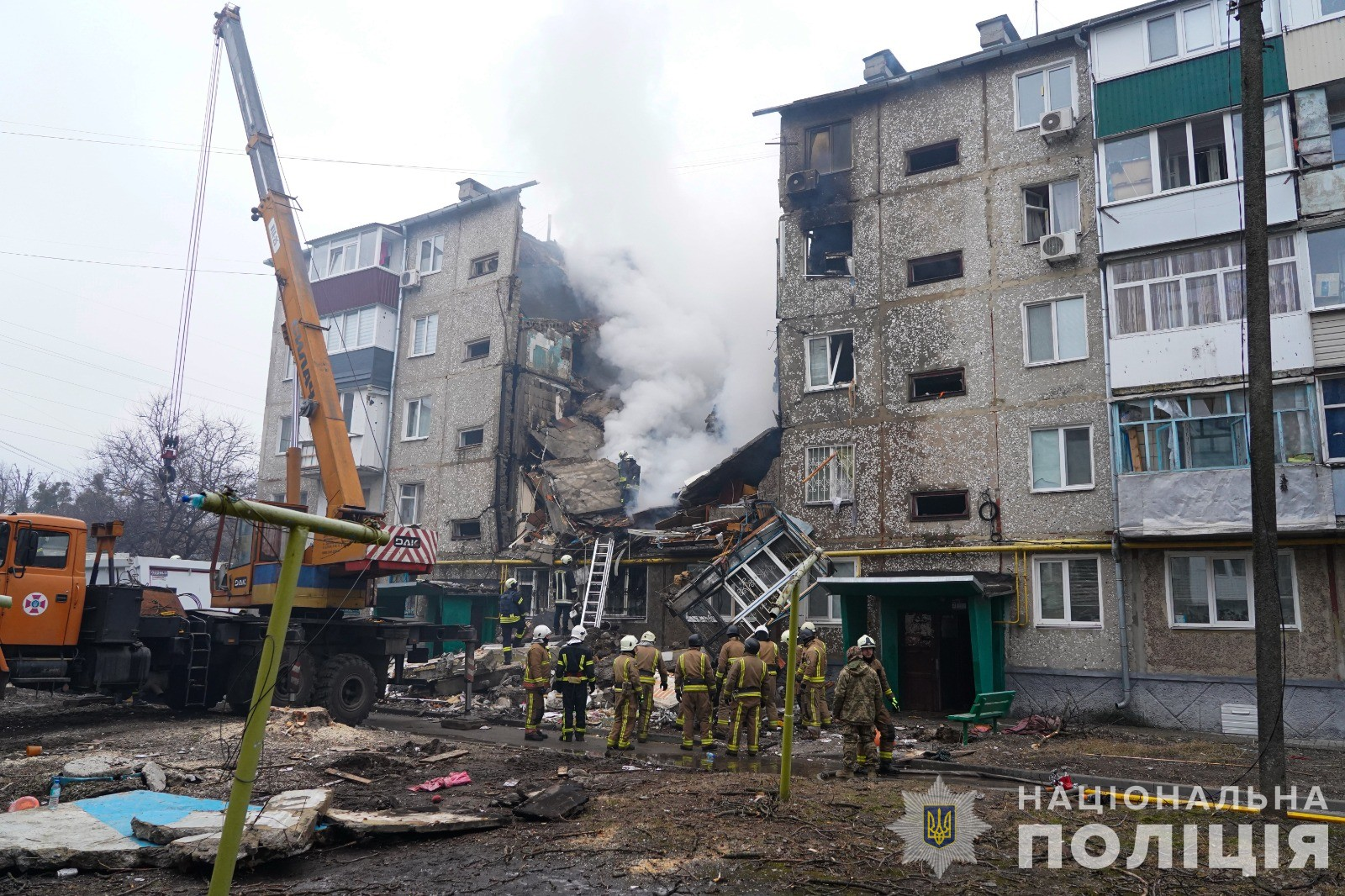
Residential building in Sumy, Ukraine after a Russian attack with Iranian drones on 13 March 2024

According to the United States, Russia sought to acquire drones from Iran during the Russo-Ukrainian war, with a Russian delegation visiting Kashan Airfield south of Tehran during June and July 2022 to observe drones manufactured by Iran. Iran criticized the assessment by the United States, saying that it would not supply Russia or Ukraine with military equipment during the war, instead demanding that both nations seek a peaceful resolution. In September 2022, the Ukrainian military claimed that it encountered an Iranian-supplied suicide drone used by Russia, publishing images of the wreckage of the drone. On October 6, 2022, Iran agreed to provide "additional" surface to air missiles and drones to Russia. On October 24, 2022, Iranian Foreign Minister Hossein Amirabdollahian said that Iran would "not remain indifferent" if it is "proven that Iranian drones are being used in the Ukraine war against people," but claimed defense cooperation between Iran and Russia would continue nonetheless.

According to various media outlets, as of 2023, American intelligence has claimed that Iran has been assisting Moscow in building a drone factory within its borders to maintain its war machine in Ukraine.

In August 2023, the White House reportedly urged Iran to cease selling armed drones to Russia as part of broader discussions in Qatar and Oman, aimed at de-escalating the nuclear crisis. This effort ran alongside negotiations for a prisoner exchange deal, which had led to the transfer of Iranian-US citizens from prison to house arrest. The US seeks to prevent Iran from supplying drones, spare parts, and other wares to Russia, which it uses in its invasion of Ukraine.

Ten days after the Crocus City Hall attack in Moscow it was reported that Iran had warned Russia that a major "terrorist operation" was being planned, based on information gathered from ISIS–K militants arrested after the 2024 Kerman bombings.

Russia supported the Turkish and Azerbaijani Zangezur corridor plan, drawing a diplomatic rebuke from Iran in 2024.

In 2023, Iran began supplying Russia with Shahed-136 loitering munitions, which Russia has employed extensively in the Russo–Ukrainian War. Under a reported US$1.75 billion agreement, Tehran provided both drones and technical assistance for domestic production in Russia. By 2025, a large manufacturing facility in the Alabuga Special Economic Zone in Tatarstan had localized the vast majority of production, reducing reliance on Iranian components and lowering unit costs.

In December 2025 it was reported that Russia was recruiting out of Iran.

==== Twelve-Day War ====
On 17 January 2025, Russian president Vladimir Putin and Iranian president Masoud Pezeshkian signed the Iranian–Russian Treaty on Comprehensive Strategic Partnership to strengthen bilateral ties. The treaty was ratified between April and June, shortly before the outbreak of the Iran–Israel war on June 13, 2025. This treaty is not a military alliance and does not commit Russia to defend Iran. Before the war, Russia also denied any military assistance to Iran in the event of a U.S. military invasion, while asserting that such an invasion would ultimately fail.

Following the Iran–Israel war that started on 13 June 2025, Russian officials described the Middle East escalation as "alarming" and "dangerous," though Russian media highlighted potential benefits for Moscow, such as rising oil prices, diminished global focus on Ukraine, and a possible diplomatic role for the Kremlin. However, analysts noted that a prolonged conflict could also carry significant risks for Russia, including the potential overthrow of Iran's current leadership and the loss of a key regional partner, after already having lost Syria.

During the war, after both Israel and the US had bombed Iran, Iranian Foreign Minister Abbas Araghchi met with Putin in Moscow on 23 June 2025. In televised remarks, Putin condemned the U.S. bombing as "absolutely unprovoked aggression" and reaffirmed Russia's intent to support the Iranian people. Araghchi, in turn, defended Iran's response as legitimate self-defense and thanked Russia for its condemnation of the attacks, praising Moscow for standing on the "right side of history and international law." While Putin expressed a desire to work together on resolving the crisis, he refrained from pledging any specific assistance to his main ally in the region. Kremlin spokesman Dmitry Peskov noted that Moscow had offered to mediate but emphasized that further action would depend on Iran's needs. The visit underscored the strength, but also the boundaries, of Iran's partnerships, as Russia's backing appeared confined to diplomacy.

In August 2025, it was confirmed that Russia had provided Iran with advanced Krasukha electronic warfare systems, which employ "a broadband multifunctional electronic attack system" which interfere with radar and satellite signals as well as intelligence, surveillance and reconnaissance (ISR) sensors, such as those used by AWACS airborne radar systems, and surveillance platforms installed on the E-8 aircraft.

On 24 August 2025, Mohammad Sadr, a member of Iran's Expediency Discernment Council, accused Russia of disclosing the locations of Iranian air defence systems, adding further that the strategic alliance with Moscow was "worthless".

==== 2026 Iran war ====
On 28 February 2026, Israel and the United States launched a joint attack on Iran, killing Supreme Leader Ali Khamenei. Vladimir Putin condemned the assassination, stating that it was "committed in cynical violation of all norms of human morality and international law." Russia was reported to have provided Iran with geospatial intelligence for targeting U.S. warships, aircraft, and military command and control infrastructure in the region.

=== Trade ===
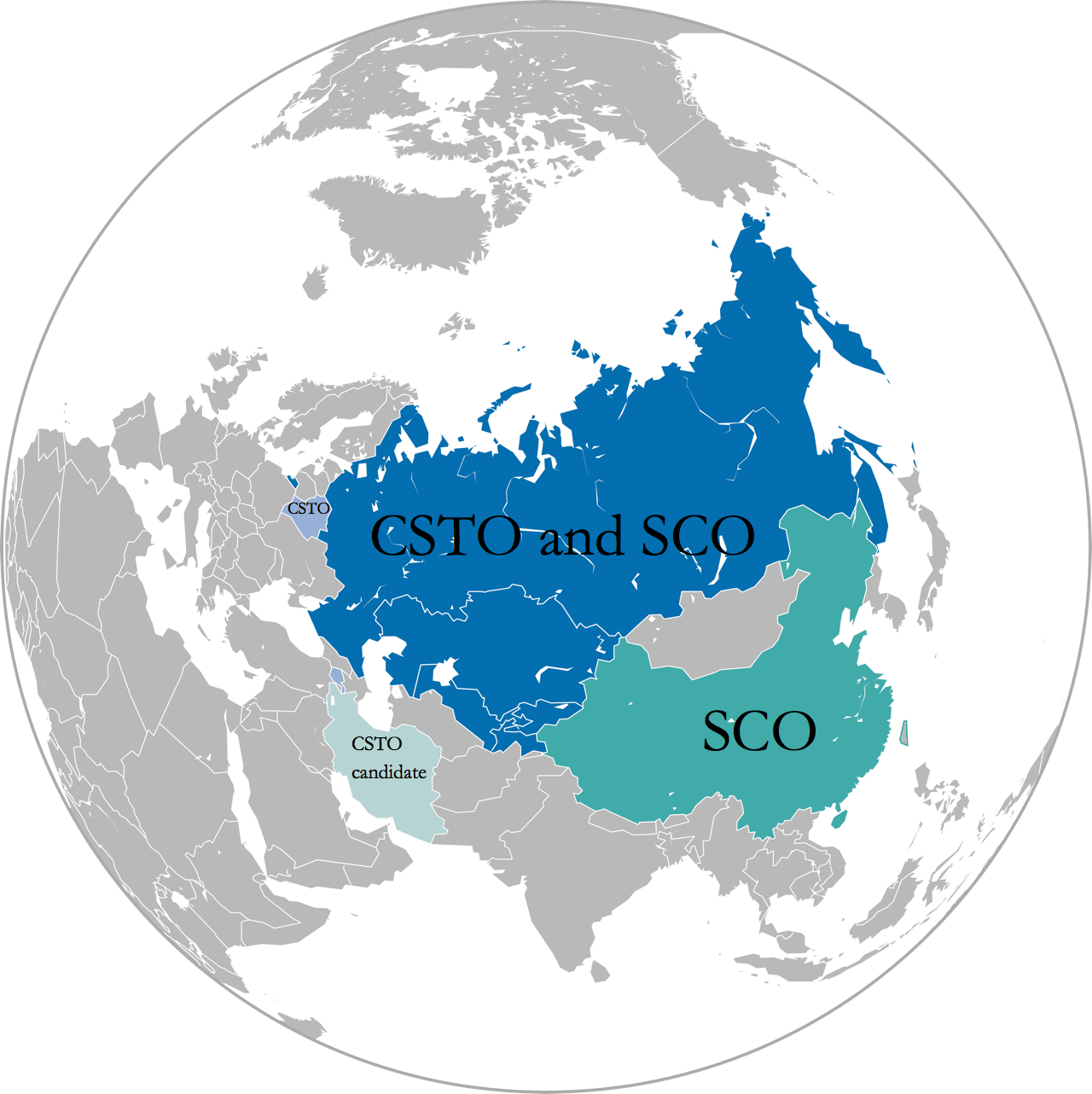
Iran is a CSTO candidate

Russia and Iran also share a common interest in limiting the political influence of the United States in Central Asia. This common interest has led the Shanghai Cooperation Organisation (SCO) to extend to Iran as observer status in 2005, and offer full membership in 2006. The Iranians attained full membership status on 17 September 2021. Moscow and Beijing supported Tehran's successful bid for full membership in the SCO.

Iran and Russia have co-founded the Gas Exporting Countries Forum along with Qatar.

In addition to their trade and cooperation in hydrocarbons, Iran and Russia have also expanded trade ties in many non-energy sectors of the economy, including a large agriculture agreement in January 2009 and a telecommunications contract in December 2008. In July 2010, Iran and Russia signed an agreement to increase their cooperation in developing their energy sectors. Features of the agreement include the establishment of a joint oil exchange, which with a combined production of up to 15 million barrels of oil per day has the potential to become a leading market globally. Gazprom and Lukoil have become increasingly involved in the development of Iranian oil and gas projects.

In 2005, Russia was the seventh largest trading partner of Iran, with 5.33% of all exports to Iran originating from Russia. Trade relations between the two increased from US$1 billion in 2005 to $3.7 billion in 2008. Motor vehicles, fruits, vegetables, glass, textiles, plastics, chemicals, hand-woven carpet, stone and plaster products were among the main Iranian non-oil goods exported to Russia.

In 2014, relations between Russia and Iran increased as both countries are under U.S. sanctions and were seeking new trade partners. The two countries signed a historic US$20 billion oil for goods deal in August 2014.

In 2021, trade between the nations rose 81% to a record $3.3 billion.

Former Iranian president Ebrahim Raisi, who was elected in 2021, seemed to prioritize trade with Russia. In early 2022, Ebrahim Raisi traveled to Russia at the invitation of his Russian counterpart. He handed over Iran's proposed draft for a 20-year cooperation agreement between Iran and Russia during his trip.

With the invasion of Ukraine in February 2022 by Russia, the U.S. and other nations have imposed sanctions on Russia. In the opinion of at least one Western writer, in order to evade sanctions, Iran and Russia could be working together to create a "clandestine banking and finance system to handle tens of billions of dollars in annual trade banned under U.S. led sanctions."

On 20 March 2022 it was reported that Iran, in the person of Agriculture Minister Javad Sadatinejad, had signed a deal in Moscow with Russia to import 20 million tons of basic goods including vegetable oil, wheat, barley and corn. The available trade data shows a balance of trade in favor of Russia, but does not include military gear totals.

In May 2022 Deputy Prime Minister Alexander Novak and Iranian Oil Minister Javad Owji, joint co-chairs of the Russian-Iranian Intergovernmental Commission had a meeting in Tehran at which they discussed such items as oil swaps, increasing joint investments, a possible free trade zone, adding to the Russian-built Bushehr Nuclear Power Plant, and developing the long-delayed North-South Transport Corridor, a rail cargo route from all the way from Russia to India, among other items.

Russian president Vladimir Putin visited Tehran on 19 July 2022 to meet with his Iranian counterpart Ebrahim Raisi and Turkey's Recep Tayyip Erdogan. The Turkish president was previously involved to mediate in the 2022 Ukraine conflict. The three nations have been holding talks in recent years as part of the "Astana peace process" to end more than 11 years of civil war in Syria. Iran and the Russian Federation attempt to boost economic ties after being hit by international sanctions.

In December 2022, Russia and Iran announced a new transcontinental trade route from the eastern edge of Europe to the Indian Ocean. The passage spans 3,000-kilometers and could be established beyond the reach of international sanctions. Russia and Iran share similar economic pressures amid sanctions – and both look east to integrate their growing economies.

In early February 2023, Tehran and Moscow announced they fully linked the Russian Financial Messaging System of the Bank of Russia (SPFS) with Iran's SEPAM national financial messaging service; both countries had been excluded from SWIFT. Bilateral economic ties had intensified since sanctions were placed on Russia after the Russian invasion of Ukraine, and chances for the revival of the JCPOA with Iran faded in late 2022. In 2022/23, Russia with US$2.7 billion is by far the largest investor in the sanctioned Iranian economy. As both countries face dramatically devalued currencies, Russia and Iran aim to link their payment system to larger economies such as India and China.

In May 2023, the US said that Iran and Russia are working to build more drones which will be used against Ukraine.

In June 2023, Iran's Transport Minister, Mehrdad Bazrpash, announced plans to create a joint shipping company with the Russian Federation. Iran places great emphasis on the importance of the Volga and Caspian Seas for trade with Russia. Both countries have reached a quadrilateral agreement with Uzbekistan and Turkmenistan regarding the transit of oil products and grain.

In September 2025, Iran signed a $25 billion agreement with Russia to build four small nuclear power plants in Sirik in Iran. The Generation III reactors are expected to produce 5 GW of electricity. Iran, which suffers power shortages at times of high demand, currently has one operating nuclear power plant, in Bushehr. Also built by Russia, it has a capacity of 1 GW.

In December 2025, Iran launched three domestically developed satellites—Paya, Kowsar, and Zafar-2—into low Earth orbit using a Russian Soyuz-2.1b rocket from Vostochny Cosmodrome. The mission, conducted in cooperation with Roscosmos, was intended for Earth observation, environmental monitoring, and agricultural research. This launch represents a continuation of bilateral collaboration in high-technology sectors and reflects the growing role of scientific and technological exchanges within the broader framework of trade and economic relations between Iran and Russia.

==== Eurasian Economic Union ====
As Iran and Russia economic and geo-political relations have improved over the years, Russia and the Eurasian Economic Union (EEU) have opted for Iran to join the EEU as well. Currently, only one EEU country, Armenia, shares a land border with Iran, but the Caspian Sea provides a direct link between Iran and Russia.

Iran has expressed interest in joining the EEU. A meeting between Kazakhstan President Nursultan Nazarbayev and Iranian president Hassan Rouhani was held in 2015 to discuss the prospect of cooperation between the customs union and Iran. According to the Iranian ambassador to Russia, Mehdi Sanaei, Iran is focusing on signing an agreement with the EEU in 2015 regarding mutual trade and reduction of import tariffs to central Asian countries and trading in national currencies as part of the agreement rather than in US dollars.

In May 2015, the Union gave the initial go-ahead to signing a free trade agreement with Iran. Andrey Slepnev, the Russian representative on the Eurasian Economic Commission board, described Iran as the EEU's "key partner in the Middle East" in an expert-level EEU meeting in Yerevan. Viktor Khristenko furthermore noted that Iran is an important partner for all the EEU member states. He stated that "Cooperation between the EEU and Iran is an important area of our work in strengthening the economic stability of the region".

In February 2023, an agreement was signed to connect the national messaging systems of Iranian and Russian banks. According to this agreement, 700 Russian banks can exchange financial messages with Iranian banks. Additionally, 106 non-Russian banks from 13 other countries have also connected to this messaging system and can exchange financial messages with Iranian banks.

=== Islands in the Strait of Hormuz ===
On 14 July 2023, the Russian minister of foreign relations supported the UAE claim on islands in the Strait of Hormuz and used the term 'Arabian gulf' instead of Persian Gulf.

In December 2023, Iran condemned further Russian statements in support of the UAE's claim.

== Sanctions ==
Both Russia and Iran are subject to international sanctions, and each extended period of sanctions seems to improve the relationship between them. This, however, has changed somewhat following the imposition of sanctions against both Russia and Iran. Improving the countries’ respective ties with the United States proved more difficult than forging closer ties between Moscow and Tehran. Since March 2014, In response to Russia's annexation of Crimea and the purposeful destabilization of Ukraine, the European Union, the U.S., and a number of other Western nations have gradually adopted restrictive sanctions against Russia. In retaliation, Russia imposed its own restrictions on Western nations, prohibiting the import of some food items. In November 2018, sanctions against Iran lifted by the JCPOA were entirely reinstated by the Trump administration, which had pulled out of the deal earlier that year. On January 17, 2025, both countries signed a strategic partnership treaty covering areas including politics, security, trade, transport and energy, however, the treaty does not include any mutual defense provisions.

== Polls ==
According to 2015 data from Pew Research Center, 54% of Russians have a negative opinion of Iran, with 34% expressing a positive opinion. According to a 2013 BBC World Service poll, 86% of Russians view Iran's influence positively, with 10% expressing a negative view. A Gallup poll from the end of 2013 showed Iran ranked as sixth greatest threat to peace in the world according to Russian view (3%), after United States (54%), China (6%), Iraq (5%), and Syria (5%). According to a December 2018 survey by IranPoll, 63.8% of Iranians have a favorable view of Russia, with 34.5% expressing an unfavorable view.

== See also ==
- Foreign relations of Iran
- Foreign relations of Russia
- Iranians in Russia
- Non-Aligned Movement
- Russo-Persian Wars
- Russians in Iran
- Khomeini's letter to Mikhail Gorbachev
- Scheherazade (Rimsky-Korsakov)
- List of ambassadors of Russia to Iran
