= Arablu =

Arablu (Persian: عربلو) may refer to:

- Arablu, Ardabil
- Arablu, East Azerbaijan
- Arablu, Hamadan
- Arablu, West Azerbaijan
- Arablu-ye Bisheh, West Azerbaijan Province
- Arablu-ye Darreh, West Azerbaijan Province
- Arablu-ye Yekan, West Azerbaijan Province
