= Sari Beygluy =

Sari Beygluy (Persian: ساري بيگلوي), also rendered as Sari Beyglar, may refer to:

- Sari Beygluy-e Araliq
- Sari Beygluy-e Cheragh
- Sari Beygluy-e Moin
- Sari Beygluy-e Musai
