= Khaneshan =

Village in West Azerbaijan province, Iran

Khaneshan خانشان
- Village
- Location within Iran
- Coordinates: 37°45′40″N 45°11′06″E
- Country: Iran
- Province: West Azerbaijan
- County: Urmia
- District: Nazlu
- Rural District: Tala Tappeh

Population (2016)
  - Total: 295
- Time zone: UTC+3:30 (IRST)

Khaneshan (Persian: خانشان, romanized: Khān-e Shān; Syriac: Ḥānīshān) (Note: Also known as Kanichan, Ḵānīšān, Khāneshān, and Khānīshān.) is a village in Tala Tappeh Rural District of Nazlu District in Urmia County, West Azerbaijan province, Iran.

== History ==
In 1862, Khaneshan with Sopurghan had a combined population of 172 Church of the East families and was served by two priests and the Church of Mār Giwārgīs. Khaneshan was made part of the new Church of the East diocese of Sopurghan in 1874. There were 40 Church of the East families at Khaneshan in 1877 with no priests or churches. The village had a mixed population of Christians and Muslims prior to the First World War, according to the list prepared by Basil Nikitin, the Russian consul at Urmia. Prior to the First World War, there were 150 Assyrian houses at Khaneshan, as per the list presented by Agha Petros to the Lausanne Peace Conference in 1922. It was located in the Anzel district. Amidst the Sayfo, the village's Christian population, then consisting of 50 Armenian and Assyrian households, was slaughtered by Turks with no survivors.

== Demographics ==
=== Population ===
At the time of the 2006 National Census, the village's population was 448 in 129 households. The following census in 2011 counted 349 people in 111 households. The 2016 census measured the population of the village as 295 people in 89 households.

== Bibliography ==
- Gaunt, David (2006). Massacres, Resistance, Protectors: Muslim-Christian Relations in Eastern Anatolia during World War I. Gorgias Press.
- Malick, David G. (2016). "Sopurḡān". In Yarshater, Ehsan (ed.). Encyclopædia Iranica (Online ed.). Encyclopædia Iranica Foundation.
- Travis, Hannibal, ed. (2018). The Assyrian Genocide: Cultural and Political Legacies (PDF). Routledge.
- Wilmshurst, David (2000). The Ecclesiastical Organisation of the Church of the East, 1318–1913 (PDF). Peeters Publishers.
