= Arabluy =

Arabluy (Persian: عربلوي) may refer to:

- Arabluy-e Bisheh
- Arabluy-e Darreh
- Arabluy-e Yekan
