= Heydarlu =

Heydarlu (Persian: حيدرلو) may refer to:

- Heydarlu, Urmia
- Heydarlu, Nazlu, Urmia County
- Heydarlu-ye Beyglar, Nazlu District, Urmia County
