= Qareh Jalu =

Qareh Jalu قره‌جلو
- Village
- Location within Iran
- Coordinates: 37°44′17″N 45°08′48″E
- Country: Iran
- Province: West Azerbaijan
- County: Urmia
- Bakhsh: Nazlu
- Rural District: Nazlu-e Shomali

Population (2006)
  - Total: 108
- Time zone: UTC+3:30 (IRST)
  - Summer (DST): UTC+4:30 (IRDT)

Qareh Jalu (Persian: قره‌جلو, romanized: Qareh Jalū; Syriac: Qārājālū) (Note: Also known as Karadjalouwi, Karajalu, Qarāǰalū, and Qarājalū.) is a village in Nazlu-e Shomali Rural District, Nazlu District, Urmia County, West Azerbaijan Province, Iran. At the 2006 census, its population was 108, in 29 families. The village has at least one Armenian church.

== History ==
The priest Ṣlībō, son of Gammō, from the Taimar district, copied a manuscript at Qārājālū in 1801. Qārājālū with Ābājālūi was inhabited by 200 Church of the East Christian families in 1862 and was served by the Church of Mart Maryam and 3 priests, according to the Russian archimandrite Sophoniah. There were 80 Church of the East Christian families at Qārājālū with 1 priest and 1 church in 1877, as per Edward Lewes Cutts. The scribe-priest Giwārgīs of Qārājālū copied a manuscript in 1877. The priest Laʿzar of Qārājālū copied a manuscript at Rome in 1886.

The Church of Mār Giwārgīs at Qārājālū was noted by Anglican missionaries in 1893. Basil Nikitin, the Russian consul at Urmia, noted that Qārājālū was entirely populated by Christians just before the First World War. Prior to the First World War, there were 300 Assyrian houses at Qārājālū, as per the list presented by Agha Petros to the Lausanne Peace Conference in 1922. It was located in the Anzel district. The villagers were massacred amidst the Sayfo.

== Bibliography ==
- Amurian, Andre; Kasheff, Manouchehr (1986). "ARMENIANS OF MODERN IRAN". In Yarshater, Ehsan (ed.). Encyclopædia Iranica (Online ed.). Encyclopædia Iranica Foundation.
- Gaunt, David (2006). Massacres, Resistance, Protectors: Muslim-Christian Relations in Eastern Anatolia during World War I. Gorgias Press.
- Wilmshurst, David (2000). The Ecclesiastical Organisation of the Church of the East, 1318–1913 (PDF). Peeters Publishers.
- Yacoub, Joseph (2016). Year of the Sword: The Assyrian Christian Genocide, A History. Translated by James Ferguson. Oxford University Press.
