= Nazlu =

Village in West Azerbaijan province, Iran

Nazlu Persian: نازلو
- Village
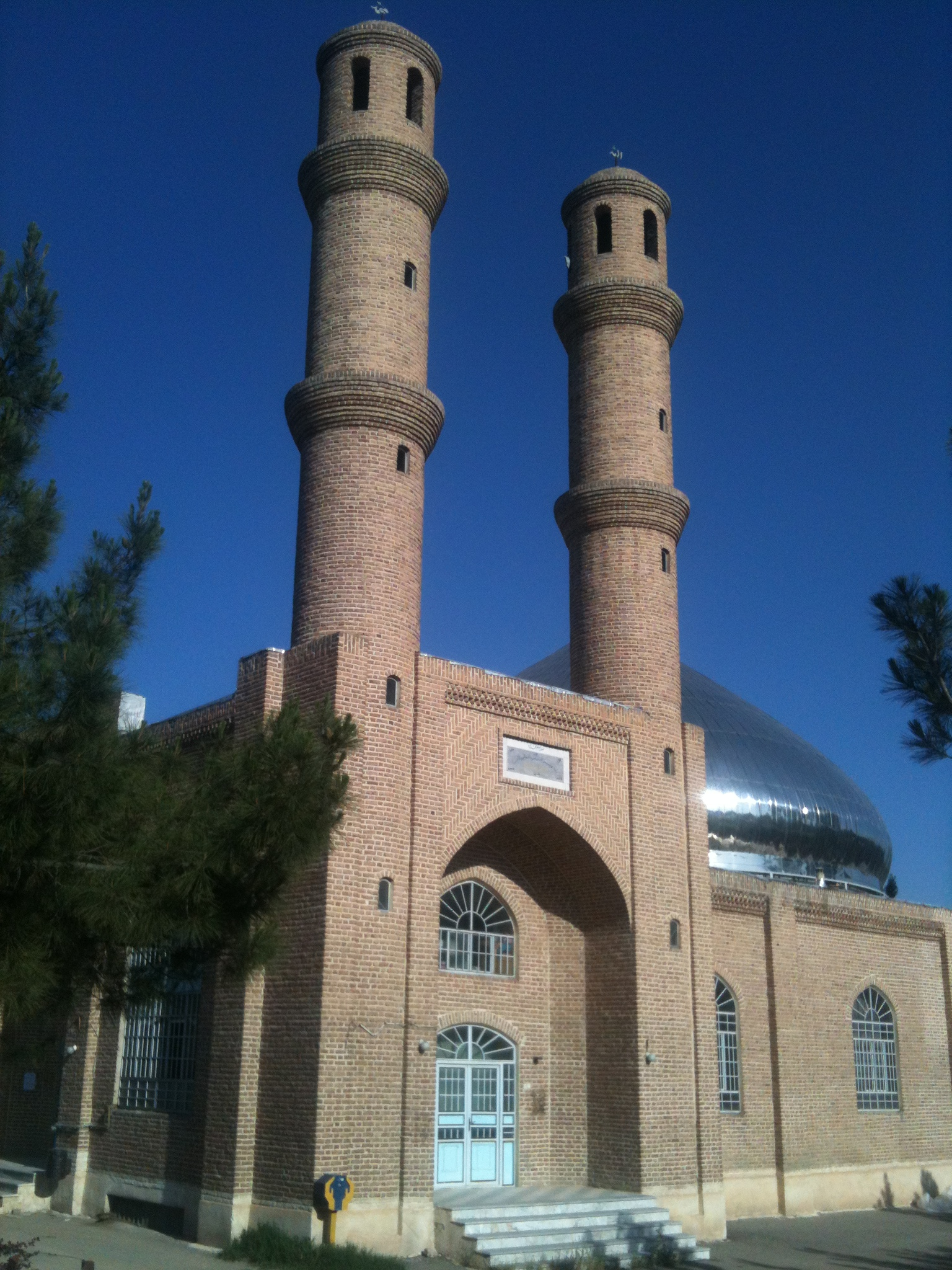

- Location within Iran
- Coordinates: 37°40′47″N 44°58′22″E
- Country: Iran
- Province: West Azerbaijan
- County: Urmia
- District: Nazlu
- Rural District: Nazluchay

Population (2016)
  - Total: 1,481
- Time zone: UTC+3:30 (IRST)

Nazlu (Persian: نازلو, romanized: Nāzlū Syriac: Nāzi) (Note: Also known as Naze.) is a village in, and the capital of, Nazluchay Rural District in Nazlu District of Urmia County, West Azerbaijan province, Iran.

== History ==
Nāzi (today called Nazlu) was the seat of a Church of the East bishop as indicated by a tombstone found in the village dated to 1489/1490 (AG 1800). Nāzi has been identified with the diocese of Nare (Neri), suffragan of the metropolis of Sopurghan, which is mentioned in the letter of Patriarch Abdisho IV Maron sent to Pope Pius IV in 1562 as one of the dioceses that recognised his authority. The priest Paul of Oramar copied a manuscript at Nāzi in 1563. The priest-scribe Joseph of Nāzi copied manuscripts in 1589 and 1591. The priest Ṣlībā, archdeacon of Salmas, copied a manuscript at Nāzi in 1712.

Nāzi was inhabited by 65 Church of the East Christian families and was served by the Church of Mart Maryam and 1 priest in 1862, according to the Russian archimandrite Sophoniah. There were 50 Church of the East Christian families with 1 church and 1 priest at Nāzi in 1877 as per Edward Lewes Cutts. There were 300 Chaldean Catholics at Nāzi with 1 priest but no church in 1913 as part of the Chaldean Catholic Archeparchy of Urmia. Basil Nikitin, the Russian consul at Urmia, recorded that the village was populated by Christians and Muslims just before the First World War. It was located in the Anzel district.

== Demographics ==
=== Population ===
At the time of the 2006 National Census, the village's population was 1,311 in 328 households. The following census in 2011 counted 1,182 people in 318 households. The 2016 census measured the population of the village as 1,481 people in 397 households.

== Bibliography ==
- Al-Jeloo, Nicholas (2010). "Evidence in Stone and Wood: The Assyrian/Syriac History and Heritage of the Urmia Region in Iran, as Reconstructed from Epigraphic Evidence". Parole de l’Orient. 35: 1–27.
- Fiey, Jean Maurice (1993). Pour un Oriens Christianus Novus: Répertoire des diocèses syriaques orientaux et occidentaux (in French).
- Wilmshurst, David (2000). The Ecclesiastical Organisation of the Church of the East, 1318–1913 (PDF). Peeters Publishers.
