= Qaterchi =

Qaterchi (Persian: قاطرچي) may refer to:

- Qaterchi, Lorestan
- Qaterchi, West Azerbaijan

== See also ==
- Tazeh Kand-e Qaterchi
