= Marangaluy =

Marangaluy (Persian: مرنگلوي), also rendered as Marangalu, may refer to:

- Marangaluy-e Bozorg
- Marangaluy-e Kuchek
