= Kavsi =

Village in West Azerbaijan province, Iran

Kavsi Persian: كوسي
- Village
- Location within Iran
- Coordinates: 37°40′37″N 45°00′04″E
- Country: Iran
- Province: West Azerbaijan
- County: Urmia
- District: Nazlu
- Rural District: Nazluchay

Population (2016)
  - Total: 706
- Time zone: UTC+3:30 (IRST)

Kavsi (Persian: كوسي, romanized: Kavsī; Syriac: Kūsi) (Note: Also known as Kowsi and Kosi.) is a village in Nazluchay Rural District of Nazlu District in Urmia County, West Azerbaijan province, Iran.

== History ==
The priest Yōḥannān of Kūsi helped the American mission with translation work from the early 1830s until his death in 1845. Kūsi was inhabited by 50 Church of the East Christian families and was served by the Church of Mart Maryam and 1 priest in 1862, according to the Russian archimandrite Sophoniah. There were 38 Church of the East Christian families and 1 church but no priest at Kūsi in 1877, as per Edward Lewes Cutts. The priest Bābā of Kūsi is also attested in 1886 as having helped the American mission with translations. Basil Nikitin, the Russian consul at Urmia, recorded that the village was entirely populated by Christians just before the First World War. It was located in the Anzel district. In 1915, amidst the Sayfo, the Turks perpetrated mass executions at Kūsi.

== Demographics ==
=== Population ===
At the time of the 2006 National Census, the village's population was 748 in 123 households. The following census in 2011 counted 740 people in 159 households. The 2016 census measured the population of the village as 706 people in 161 households.

== Bibliography ==
- Gaunt, David (2006). Massacres, Resistance, Protectors: Muslim-Christian Relations in Eastern Anatolia during World War I. Gorgias Press.
- Hellot-Bellier, Florence (2017). "The Resistance of Urmia Assyrians to Violence at the Beginning of the Twentieth Century". In David Gaunt; Naures Atto; Soner O. Barthoma (eds.). Let Them Not Return: Sayfo – The Genocide against the Assyrian, Syriac and Chaldean Christians in the Ottoman Empire (PDF). pp. 70–99.
- Wilmshurst, David (2000). The Ecclesiastical Organisation of the Church of the East, 1318–1913 (PDF). Peeters Publishers.
