= Abajaluy =

Abajaluy (Persian: اباجالوي), also rendered as Abajalu, may refer to:

- Abajaluy-e Olya
- Abajaluy-e Sofla
