= Owsaluy =

Owsaluy (Persian: اوصالوي), also rendered as Owsalu or Usalu, may refer to:

- Owsaluy-e Allahverdi Khan
- Owsaluy-e Kazem
