= Adeh =

Adeh (Persian: اده) may refer to:

- Adeh, Naqadeh
- Adeh, Urmia
- Adeh-e Mortezapasha, Urmia County
