= Tala Tappeh =

Village in West Azerbaijan province, Iran

Tala Tappeh طلاتپه
- Village
- Location within Iran
- Coordinates: 37°43′09″N 45°10′47″E
- Country: Iran
- Province: West Azerbaijan
- County: Urmia
- District: Nazlu
- Rural District: Tala Tappeh

Population (2016)
  - Total: 547
- Time zone: UTC+3:30 (IRST)

Tala Tappeh (Persian: طلاتپه) (Note: Also romanized as Ţalā Tappeh) is a village in, and the capital of, Tala Tappeh Rural District in Nazlu District of Urmia County, West Azerbaijan province, Iran.

== Demographics ==
=== Population ===
At the time of the 2006 National Census, the village's population was 796 in 264 households. The following census in 2011 counted 691 people in 229 households. The 2016 census measured the population of the village as 547 people in 206 households. It was the most populous village in its rural district.
