= Saatluy =

Saatluy (Persian: ساعتلوي) may refer to:

- Saatluy Kuh
- Saatluy-e Beyglar
