= Sari Beygluy-e Cheragh =

Sari Beygluy-e Cheragh ساري بيگلوي چراغ
- Village
- Location within Iran
- Coordinates: 37°43′52″N 45°07′27″E
- Country: Iran
- Province: West Azerbaijan
- County: Urmia
- Bakhsh: Nazlu
- Rural District: Nazlu-e Shomali

Population (2006)
  - Total: 500
- Time zone: UTC+3:30 (IRST)
  - Summer (DST): UTC+4:30 (IRDT)

Sari Beygluy-e Cheragh (Persian: ساري بيگلوي چراغ, also Romanized as Sārī Beyglūy-e Cherāgh; also known as Sārī Beyglar-e Cherāgh and Sārī Beyglū-ye Cherāgh) is a village in Nazlu-e Shomali Rural District, Nazlu District, Urmia County, West Azerbaijan Province, Iran. At the 2006 census, its population was 500, in 125 families.
