= Shams-e Hajjian =

Village in West Azerbaijan province, Iran

Shams-e Hajjian Persian: شمس حاجيان
- Village
- Location within Iran
- Coordinates: 37°27′42″N 45°10′08″E
- Country: Iran
- Province: West Azerbaijan
- County: Urmia
- District: Central
- Rural District: Baranduzchay-ye Shomali

Population (2016)
  - Total: 489
- Time zone: UTC+3:30 (IRST)

Shams-e Hajjian (Persian: شمس حاجيان, romanized: Shams-e Ḩājjīān; Syriac: Shimshājeyan) (Note: Also known as Chachajihan, Šemšadjian, Shamshamjian, Shamshajian, and Shemshejian.) is a village in Baranduzchay-ye Shomali Rural District of the Central District in Urmia County, West Azerbaijan province, Iran.

== History ==
In 1862, Shimshājeyan (today called Shams-e Hajjian) was inhabited by 30 Church of the East Christian families, who were served by the Church of Beni Shmūni but did not have a priest, according to the Russian archimandrite Sophoniah. There were 38 Church of the East Christian families at Shimshājeyan in 1877 with 1 church and no priests, as per Edward Lewes Cutts.

François Lesné, the Apostolic delegate of the Roman Catholic Church in Iran, recorded that the village was attacked by Kurds in May 1908. Muhtasham es-Saltaneh, governor of Urmia, had provided weapons to an Assyrian committee led by Faramarz Khan with responsibility for the protection of Shimshājeyan, Dīzātakā, Ardishai, and Gūgtāpāh, which were designated as places of refuge for people from smaller villages. During the battle, 3 Mawananians launched their own siege against 60 Kurds who were hidden in the poplar woods, according to the Lazarist Aristide Chatelet.

There were 320 Chaldean Catholics with 1 priest and no church at Shimshājeyan in 1913 as part of the Chaldean Catholic Archeparchy of Urmia. Basil Nikitin, the Russian consul at Urmia, recorded that the village was entirely populated by Christians just before the First World War. It was located in the Baranduz district.

== Demographics ==
=== Population ===
At the time of the 2006 National Census, the village's population was 511 in 129 households. The following census in 2011 counted 434 people in 125 households. The 2016 census measured the population of the village as 489 people in 156 households.

== Bibliography ==
- Gaunt, David (2006). Massacres, Resistance, Protectors: Muslim-Christian Relations in Eastern Anatolia during World War I. Gorgias Press.
- Hellot-Bellier, Florence (2017). "The Resistance of Urmia Assyrians to Violence at the Beginning of the Twentieth Century". In David Gaunt; Naures Atto; Soner O. Barthoma (eds.). Let Them Not Return: Sayfo – The Genocide against the Assyrian, Syriac and Chaldean Christians in the Ottoman Empire (PDF). pp. 70–99.
- Wilmshurst, David (2000). The Ecclesiastical Organisation of the Church of the East, 1318–1913 (PDF). Peeters Publishers.
