= Ali Beyglu, Urmia =

Village in West Azerbaijan province, Iran

Ali Beyglu Persian: علي بيگلو
- Village
- Location within Iran
- Coordinates: 37°44′26″N 45°04′47″E
- Country: Iran
- Province: West Azerbaijan
- County: Urmia
- District: Nazlu
- Rural District: Nazluy-e Shomali

Population (2016)
  - Total: 893
- Time zone: UTC+3:30 (IRST)

Ali Beyglu (Persian: علي بيگلو) (Note: Also romanized as Alibeyglu and ‘Alībeyglū; also known as ‘Alībeglū) is a village in Nazluy-e Shomali Rural District of Nazlu District in Urmia County, West Azerbaijan province, Iran.

== Demographics ==
=== Population ===
At the time of the 2006 National Census, the village's population was 913 in 267 households. The following census in 2011 counted 884 people in 289 households. The 2016 census measured the population of the village as 893 people in 296 households.
