= Zirmanlu =

Village in West Azerbaijan province, Iran

Zirmanlu زيرمانلو
- Village
- Location within Iran
- Coordinates: 37°43′23″N 45°12′19″E
- Country: Iran
- Province: West Azerbaijan
- County: Urmia
- District: Nazlu
- Rural District: Tala Tappeh

Population (2016)
  - Total: 74
- Time zone: UTC+3:30 (IRST)

Zirmanlu (Persian: زيرمانلو) (Note: Also romanized as Zīrmānlū; also known as Zarmānlū) is a village in Tala Tappeh Rural District of Nazlu District in Urmia County, West Azerbaijan province, Iran.

== Demographics ==
=== Population ===
At the time of the 2006 National Census, the village's population was 203 in 55 households. The following census in 2011 counted 106 people in 31 households. The 2016 census measured the population of the village as 74 people in 25 households.
