= Hesar-e Sopurghan =

Village in West Azerbaijan province, Iran

Hesar-e Sopurghan حصارسپورغان
- Village
- Location within Iran
- Coordinates: 37°44′27″N 45°11′39″E
- Country: Iran
- Province: West Azerbaijan
- County: Urmia
- District: Nazlu
- Rural District: Tala Tappeh

Population (2016)
  - Total: 132
- Time zone: UTC+3:30 (IRST)

Hesar-e Sopurghan (Persian: حصارسپورغان) (Note: Also romanized as Ḩeşār-e Sopūrghān; also known as Ḩeşār-e Soporghān) is a village in Tala Tappeh Rural District of Nazlu District in Urmia County, West Azerbaijan province, Iran.

== Demographics ==
=== Population ===
At the time of the 2006 National Census, the village's population was 141 in 45 households. The following census in 2011 counted 115 people in 38 households. The 2016 census measured the population of the village as 132 people in 43 households.
