= Angeneh =

Village in West Azerbaijan province, Iran

Angeneh Persian: انگنه
- Village
- Location within Iran
- Coordinates: 37°47′28″N 45°06′48″E
- Country: Iran
- Province: West Azerbaijan
- County: Urmia
- District: Nazlu
- Rural District: Nazluy-e Shomali

Population (2016)
  - Total: 545
- Time zone: UTC+3:30 (IRST)

Angeneh (Persian: انگنه) (Note: Also romanized as Anganeh; also known as Angyan and Angyana) is a village in Nazluy-e Shomali Rural District of Nazlu District in Urmia County, West Azerbaijan province, Iran.

== Demographics ==
=== Population ===
At the time of the 2006 National Census, the village's population was 628 in 168 households. The following census in 2011 counted 560 people in 173 households. The 2016 census measured the population of the village as 545 people in 169 households.
