= Asgarabad-e Kuh =

Village in West Azerbaijan province, Iran

Asgarabad-e Kuh Persian: عسگرابادكوه
- Village
- Location within Iran
- Coordinates: 37°44′14″N 45°00′22″E
- Country: Iran
- Province: West Azerbaijan
- County: Urmia
- District: Nazlu
- Rural District: Nazluy-e Shomali

Population (2016)
  - Total: 973
- Time zone: UTC+3:30 (IRST)

Asgarabad-e Kuh (Persian: عسگرابادكوه) (Note: Also romanized as ‘Asgarābād-e Kūh; also known as ‘Asgarābād) is a village in Nazluy-e Shomali Rural District of Nazlu District in Urmia County, West Azerbaijan province, Iran.

== Demographics ==
=== Population ===
At the time of the 2006 National Census, the village's population was 880 in 211 households. The following census in 2011 counted 832 people in 243 households. The 2016 census measured the population of the village as 973 people in 286 households.
