= Vaqasluy =

Vaqasluy (Persian: وقاصلوي), also rendered as Vaqaslu, also known as Kachalali, may refer to:

- Vaqasluy-e Olya
- Vaqasluy-e Sofla
