= Bahlulabad, Urmia =

Village in West Azerbaijan province, Iran

Bahlulabad Persian: بهلول اباد
- Village
- Location within Iran
- Coordinates: 37°40′43″N 44°56′38″E
- Country: Iran
- Province: West Azerbaijan
- County: Urmia
- District: Nazlu
- Rural District: Nazluchay

Population (2016)
  - Total: 716
- Time zone: UTC+3:30 (IRST)

Bahlulabad (Persian: بهلول اباد) (Note: Also romanized as Bahlūlābād) is a village in Nazluchay Rural District of Nazlu District in Urmia County, West Azerbaijan province, Iran.

== Demographics ==
=== Population ===
At the time of the 2006 National Census, the village's population was 751 in 134 households. The following census in 2011 counted 787 people in 181 households. The 2016 census measured the population of the village as 716 people in 167 households.
