= Tazeh Kand-e Qaterchi =

Tazeh Kand-e Qaterchi تازه كندقاطرچي
- Village
- Location within Iran
- Coordinates: 37°39′46″N 44°58′30″E
- Country: Iran
- Province: West Azerbaijan
- County: Urmia
- Bakhsh: Nazlu
- Rural District: Nazluchay

Population (2006)
  - Total: 283
- Time zone: UTC+3:30 (IRST)
  - Summer (DST): UTC+4:30 (IRDT)

Tazeh Kand-e Qaterchi (Persian: تازه كندقاطرچي, also Romanized as Tāzeh Kand-e Qāţerchī) is a village in Nazluchay Rural District, Nazlu District, Urmia County, West Azerbaijan Province, Iran. At the 2006 census, its population was 283, in 78 families.
