= Marangaluy-e Bozorg =

Marangaluy-e Bozorg مرنگلوي بزرگ
- Village
- Location within Iran
- Coordinates: 37°47′17″N 45°09′24″E
- Country: Iran
- Province: West Azerbaijan
- County: Urmia
- Bakhsh: Nazlu
- Rural District: Nazlu-e Shomali

Population (2006)
  - Total: 478
- Time zone: UTC+3:30 (IRST)
  - Summer (DST): UTC+4:30 (IRDT)

Marangaluy-e Bozorg (Persian: مرنگلوي بزرگ, also Romanized as Marangalūy-e Bozorg; also known as Marangalū-ye Bozorg) is a village in Nazlu-e Shomali Rural District, Nazlu District, Urmia County, West Azerbaijan Province, Iran. At the 2006 census, its population was 478, in 139 families.
