= Rahimabad, Nazlu =

Village in West Azerbaijan province, Iran

Rahimabad Persian: رحيم اباد
- Village
- Location within Iran
- Coordinates: 37°45′41″N 45°04′16″E
- Country: Iran
- Province: West Azerbaijan
- County: Urmia
- District: Nazlu
- Rural District: Nazluy-e Shomali

Population (2016)
  - Total: 657
- Time zone: UTC+3:30 (IRST)

Rahimabad (Persian: رحيم اباد) (Note: Also romanized as Raḩīmābād; also known as Shamūlābād) is a village in Nazluy-e Shomali Rural District of Nazlu District in Urmia County, West Azerbaijan province, Iran.

== Demographics ==
=== Population ===
At the time of the 2006 National Census, the village's population was 562 in 138 households. The following census in 2011 counted 660 people in 197 households. The 2016 census measured the population of the village as 657 people in 207 households.
