= Par, Iran =

Village in West Azerbaijan province, Iran

Par Persian: پر
- Village
- Location within Iran
- Coordinates: 37°40′54″N 45°00′39″E
- Country: Iran
- Province: West Azerbaijan
- County: Urmia
- District: Nazlu
- Rural District: Nazluy-e Shomali

Population (2016)
  - Total: 519
- Time zone: UTC+3:30 (IRST)

Par (Persian: پر) is a village in Nazluy-e Shomali Rural District of Nazlu District in Urmia County, West Azerbaijan province, Iran.

== Demographics ==
=== Population ===
At the time of the 2006 National Census, the village's population was 630 in 156 households. The following census in 2011 counted 612 people in 186 households. The 2016 census measured the population of the village as 519 people in 159 households.
