= Heydarlu, Nazlu =

Heydarlu حيدرلو
- Village
- Location within Iran
- Coordinates: 37°46′14″N 45°08′52″E
- Country: Iran
- Province: West Azerbaijan
- County: Urmia
- Bakhsh: Nazlu
- Rural District: Nazlu-e Shomali

Population (2006)
  - Total: 202
- Time zone: UTC+3:30 (IRST)
  - Summer (DST): UTC+4:30 (IRDT)

Heydarlu (Persian: حيدرلو, also Romanized as Ḩeydarlū; also known as Ḩeydarlū-ye Soflá) is a village in Nazlu-e Shomali Rural District, Nazlu District, Urmia County, West Azerbaijan Province, Iran. At the 2006 census, its population was 202, in 56 families.
