= Dizaj-e Takyeh =

Village in West Azerbaijan province, Iran

Dizaj-e Takyeh Persian: ديزج تكيه
- Village
- Location within Iran
- Coordinates: 37°25′21″N 45°10′24″E
- Country: Iran
- Province: West Azerbaijan
- County: Urmia
- District: Central
- Rural District: Baranduzchay-ye Shomali

Population (2016)
  - Total: 691
- Time zone: UTC+3:30 (IRST)

Dizaj-e Takyeh (Persian: ديزج تكيه, romanized: Dīzaj-e Takyeh; Syriac: Dīzātakā) (Note: Also known as Dezatekia, Dezatakieh, Dezzatekieh, Dīzaǰ-taka, Dizza-Takka, Dizzā-Takkyā, Dizzatakieh, Dizzatakia, and Diza-Tékia.) is a village in Baranduzchay-ye Shomali Rural District of the Central District in Urmia County, West Azerbaijan province, Iran. The village has at least one Armenian church.

== History ==
Dīzātakā (today called Dizaj-e Takyeh) was inhabited by 110 Church of the East Christian families who were served by the Church of Mār Shallīṭā and 1 priest in 1862, according to the Russian archimandrite Sophoniah. There were 154 Church of the East Christian families at Dīzātakā with 1 priest and 2 churches in 1877, as per Edward Lewes Cutts.

François Lesné, the Apostolic delegate of the Roman Catholic Church in Iran, recorded in a letter to the Lazarist Emile Sontag at Tehran that Dīzātakā was attacked by Kurds in 1908. Muhtasham es-Saltaneh, governor of Urmia, had provided weapons to an Assyrian committee led by Faramarz Khan with responsibility for the protection of Shimshājeyan, Dīzātakā, Ardishai, and Gūgtāpāh, which were designated as places of refuge for people from smaller villages.

Basil Nikitin, the Russian consul at Urmia, recorded that the village was populated by Christians and Muslims just before the First World War. It was located in the Baranduz district. Prior to the First World War, there were 500 Assyrian houses at Dīzātakā, as per the list presented by Agha Petros to the Lausanne Peace Conference in 1922.

== Demographics ==
=== Population ===
At the time of the 2006 National Census, the village's population was 737 in 204 households. The following census in 2011 counted 709 people in 213 households. The 2016 census measured the population of the village as 691 people in 226 households.

== Notable people ==
- Ashiq Yusuf Ohanes (1927–2019), Assyrian ashiq

== Bibliography ==
- Al-Jeloo, Nicholas (2010). "Evidence in Stone and Wood: The Assyrian/Syriac History and Heritage of the Urmia Region in Iran, as Reconstructed from Epigraphic Evidence". Parole de l’Orient. 35: 1–27.
- Al-Jeloo, Nicholas (2015). "Persian Christians: Assyrian art and architecture of Urmia as an example of regional cultural expression". Parole de l’Orient. 40: 13–27.
- Amurian, Andre; Kasheff, Manouchehr (1986). "ARMENIANS OF MODERN IRAN". In Yarshater, Ehsan (ed.). Encyclopædia Iranica (Online ed.). Encyclopædia Iranica Foundation.
- Gaunt, David (2006). Massacres, Resistance, Protectors: Muslim-Christian Relations in Eastern Anatolia during World War I. Gorgias Press.
- Hellot-Bellier, Florence (2017). "The Resistance of Urmia Assyrians to Violence at the Beginning of the Twentieth Century". In David Gaunt; Naures Atto; Soner O. Barthoma (eds.). Let Them Not Return: Sayfo – The Genocide against the Assyrian, Syriac and Chaldean Christians in the Ottoman Empire (PDF). pp. 70–99.
- Wilmshurst, David (2000). The Ecclesiastical Organisation of the Church of the East, 1318–1913 (PDF). Peeters Publishers.
