= Abajaluy-e Olya =

Abajaluy-e Olya اباجالوي عليا
- Village
- Location within Iran
- Coordinates: 37°43′38″N 45°09′01″E
- Country: Iran
- Province: West Azerbaijan
- County: Urmia
- Bakhsh: Nazlu
- Rural District: Nazlu-e Shomali

Population (2006)
  - Total: 250
- Time zone: UTC+3:30 (IRST)
  - Summer (DST): UTC+4:30 (IRDT)
- Climate: BSk

Abajaluy-e Olya (Persian: اباجالوي عليا, romanized: Abājalūy-e ‘Olyā; Syriac: Ābājālūi) (Note: Also known as Abadjalouwi, Abajālū, and Abājalū-ye ‘Olyā.) is a village in Nazlu-e Shomali Rural District, Nazlu District, Urmia County, West Azerbaijan Province, Iran. At the 2006 census, its population was 250, in 68 families.

== History ==
Ābājālūi (today called Abajaluy-e Olya) with Qārājālū was inhabited by 200 Church of the East Christian families in 1862 and was served by the Church of Mart Maryam and 3 priests, according to the Russian archimandrite Sophoniah. At this time, Ābājālūi was tended to by the priests Murādḥān, Paul, and Laʿzar of Qārājālū. There were 15 Church of the East Christian families with 1 church and no priests at Ābājālūi in 1877, as per Edward Lewes Cutts. Prior to the First World War, there were 120 Assyrian houses at Ābājālūi, as per the list presented by Agha Petros to the Lausanne Peace Conference in 1922. It was located in the Anzel district.

== Notable people ==
- Andrew David Urshan (1884–1967), Assyrian evangelist and author

== Bibliography ==
- Al-Jeloo, Nicholas (2015). "Persian Christians: Assyrian art and architecture of Urmia as an example of regional cultural expression". Parole de l’Orient. 40: 13–27.
- Gaunt, David (2006). Massacres, Resistance, Protectors: Muslim-Christian Relations in Eastern Anatolia during World War I. Gorgias Press.
- Wilmshurst, David (2000). The Ecclesiastical Organisation of the Church of the East, 1318–1913 (PDF). Peeters Publishers.
