= Kharabeh-ye Senji =

Village in West Azerbaijan province, Iran

Kharabeh-ye Senji Persian: خرابه سنجي
- Village
- Location within Iran
- Coordinates: 37°47′03″N 44°54′00″E
- Country: Iran
- Province: West Azerbaijan
- County: Urmia
- District: Nazlu
- Rural District: Nazluchay

Population (2016)
  - Total: 561
- Time zone: UTC+3:30 (IRST)

Kharabeh-ye Senji (Persian: خرابه سنجي) (Note: Also romanized as Kharābeh-ye Senjī; also known as Kharābeh) is a village in Nazluchay Rural District of Nazlu District in Urmia County, West Azerbaijan province, Iran.

== Demographics ==
=== Population ===
At the time of the 2006 National Census, the village's population was 681 in 95 households. The following census in 2011 counted 622 people in 137 households. The 2016 census measured the population of the village as 561 people in 110 households.
