= Vaqasluy-e Sofla =

Vaqasluy-e Sofla وقاصلوي سفلي
- Village
- Location within Iran
- Coordinates: 37°36′00″N 45°01′00″E
- Country: Iran
- Province: West Azerbaijan
- County: Urmia
- Bakhsh: Nazlu
- Rural District: Nazlu-e Shomali

Population (2006)
  - Total: 516
- Time zone: UTC+3:30 (IRST)
  - Summer (DST): UTC+4:30 (IRDT)

Vaqasluy-e Sofla (Persian: وقاصلوي سفلي, also Romanized as Vaqāşlūy-e Soflá; also known as Kachal‘alī-ye Soflá and Vaqāşlū-ye Soflá) is a village in Nazlu-e Shomali Rural District, Nazlu District, Urmia County, West Azerbaijan Province, Iran. At the 2006 census, its population was 516, in 116 families.
