= Qaleh Sardar, West Azerbaijan =

Village in West Azerbaijan province, Iran

Qaleh Sardar Persian: قلعه سردار
- Village
- Location within Iran
- Coordinates: 37°41′03″N 44°57′31″E
- Country: Iran
- Province: West Azerbaijan
- County: Urmia
- District: Nazlu
- Rural District: Nazluchay

Population (2016)
  - Total: 1,045
- Time zone: UTC+3:30 (IRST)

Qaleh Sardar (Persian: قلعه سردار) (Note: Also romanized as Qal‘eh Sardār; also known as Qal‘eh) is a village in Nazluchay Rural District of Nazlu District in Urmia County, West Azerbaijan province, Iran.

== Demographics ==
=== Population ===
At the time of the 2006 National Census, the village's population was 387 in 90 households. The following census in 2011 counted 1,560 people in 428 households. The 2016 census measured the population of the village as 1,045 people in 262 households.
