= Chonqeraluy =

Chonqeraluy (Persian: چنقرالوي), also rendered as Chunqeraluy or Chownqoralu or Chonqeralu, may refer to:

- Chonqeraluy-e Pol
- Chonqeraluy-e Yekan
