= Azadegan, West Azerbaijan =

Azadegan ازادگان
- Village
- Location within Iran
- Coordinates: 37°40′04″N 44°59′21″E
- Country: Iran
- Province: West Azerbaijan
- County: Urmia
- Bakhsh: Nazlu
- Rural District: Nazluchay

Population (2006)
  - Total: 271
- Time zone: UTC+3:30 (IRST)
  - Summer (DST): UTC+4:30 (IRDT)

Azadegan (Persian: ازادگان, also Romanized as Āzādegān; also known as Qāţerchī) is a village in Nazluchay Rural District, Nazlu District, Urmia County, West Azerbaijan Province, Iran. At the 2006 census, its population was 271, in 82 families.
