= Bashlan Beshlu =

Village in West Azerbaijan province, Iran

Bashlan Beshlu Persian: باشلان بشلو
- Village
- Location within Iran
- Coordinates: 37°47′25″N 45°06′11″E
- Country: Iran
- Province: West Azerbaijan
- County: Urmia
- District: Nazlu
- Rural District: Nazluy-e Shomali

Population (2016)
  - Total: 546
- Time zone: UTC+3:30 (IRST)

Bashlan Beshlu (Persian: باشلان بشلو) (Note: Also romanized as Bāshlān Beshlū; also known as Bāshlā Nabeshlū, Bāshlān Būshlū, and Qarchālār) is a village in Nazluy-e Shomali Rural District of Nazlu District in Urmia County, West Azerbaijan province, Iran.

== Demographics ==
=== Population ===
At the time of the 2006 National Census, the village's population was 634 in 174 households. The following census in 2011 counted 546 people in 174 households. The 2016 census measured the population of the village as 546 people in 175 households.
