= Yengejeh, Nazlu =

Village in West Azerbaijan province, Iran

Yengejeh ينگجه
- Village
- Location within Iran
- Coordinates: 37°44′34″N 45°10′14″E
- Country: Iran
- Province: West Azerbaijan
- County: Urmia
- District: Nazlu
- Rural District: Tala Tappeh

Population (2016)
  - Total: 90
- Time zone: UTC+3:30 (IRST)

Yengejeh (Persian: ينگجه; Syriac: Yangījā) (Note: Also spelt as Yangija.) is a village in Tala Tappeh Rural District of Nazlu District in Urmia County, West Azerbaijan province, Iran.

== History ==
In 1862, Yangījā (today called Yengejeh) was inhabited by 65 Church of the East Christian families and was served by one priest and the Church of Mart Maryam, according to the Russian archimandrite Sophoniah. There were 24 Church of the East Christian families with one priest and one church at the village in 1877, as per Edward Lewes Cutts. The village was entirely populated by Christians, prior to the First World War, according to the list prepared by Basil Nikitin, the Russian consul at Urmia. It was located in the Anzel district.

== Demographics ==
=== Population ===
At the time of the 2006 National Census, the village's population was 99 in 25 households. The following census in 2011 counted 65 people in 19 households. The 2016 census measured the population of the village as 90 people in 32 households.

== Bibliography ==
- Baumer, Christoph (2016). The Church of the East: An Illustrated History of Assyrian Christianity. London-New York: Tauris.
- Wilmshurst, David (2000). The Ecclesiastical Organisation of the Church of the East, 1318–1913 (PDF). Peeters Publishers.
