= Esmail Aqa Qalehsi =

Village in West Azerbaijan province, Iran

Esmail Aqa Qalehsi Persian: اسماعيل آقا قلعه سي
- Village
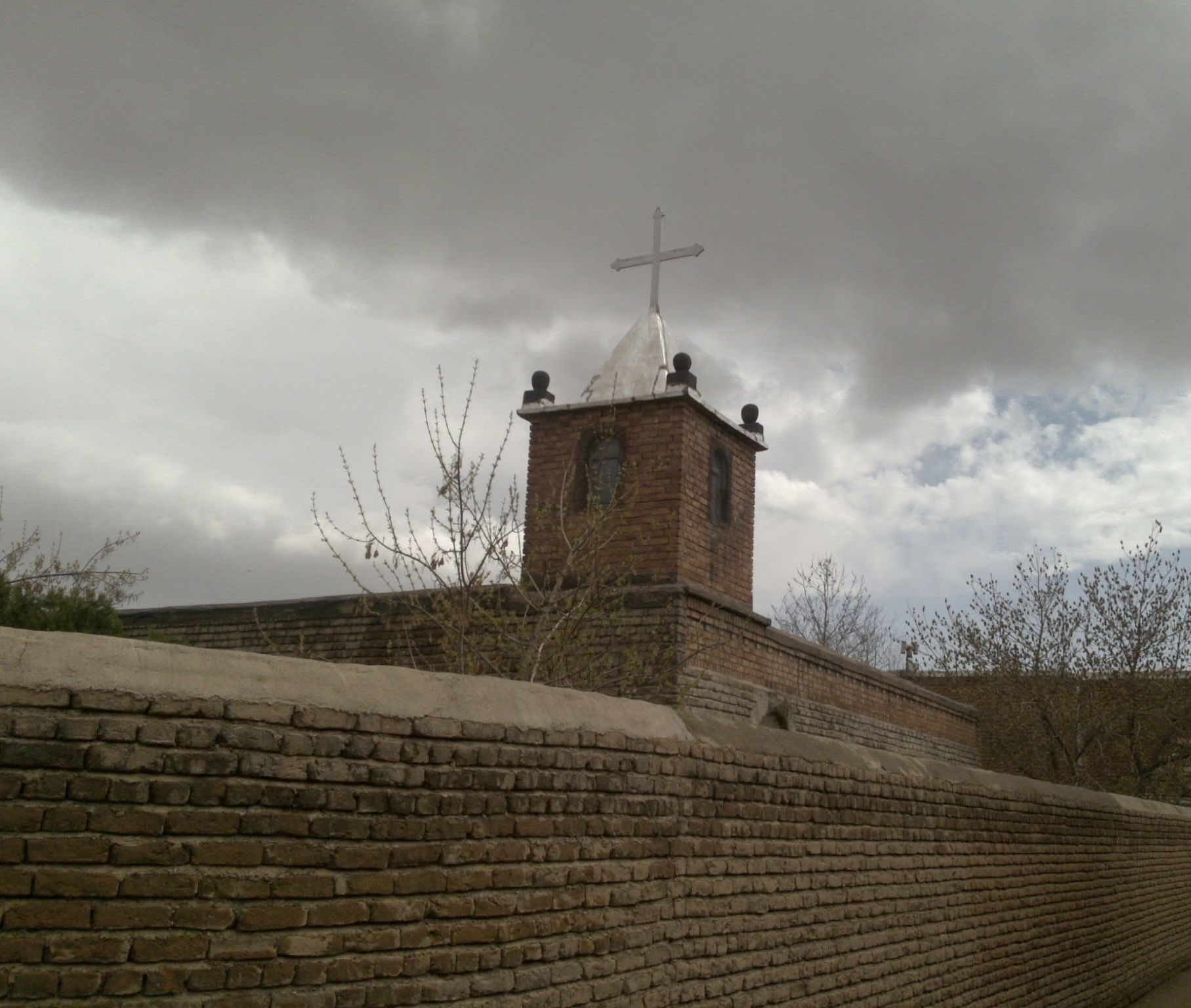
- Mar Bishu Church, Esmail Aqa Qalehsi

- Location within Iran
- Coordinates: 37°39′54″N 44°55′47″E
- Country: Iran
- Province: West Azerbaijan
- County: Urmia
- District: Nazlu
- Rural District: Nazluchay

Population (2016)
  - Total: 873
- Time zone: UTC+3:30 (IRST)

Esmail Aqa Qalehsi (Persian: اسماعيل آقا قلعه سي) (Note: Also romanized as Esmā‘īl Āqā Qal‘ehsī and Esmā‘īlāqā Qal‘ehsī; formerly known as Qaleh-ye Esmail Aqa (قلعه اسماعيل اقا), also romanized as Qal‘eh-ye Esmā‘īl Āqā and Qal‘eh-ye Esmā‘īlāqā) is a village in Nazluchay Rural District of Nazlu District in Urmia County, West Azerbaijan province, Iran.

== Demographics ==
=== Population ===
At the time of the 2006 National Census, the village's population, as Qaleh-ye Esmail Aqa, was 897 in 140 households. The following census in 2011 counted 960 people in 216 households, by which time the village was listed as Esmail Aqa Qalehsi. The 2016 census measured the population of the village as 873 people in 183 households.
