= Senji, Urmia =

Village in West Azerbaijan province, Iran

Senji Persian: سنجي
- Village
- Location within Iran
- Coordinates: 37°44′10″N 44°55′17″E
- Country: Iran
- Province: West Azerbaijan
- County: Urmia
- District: Nazlu
- Rural District: Nazluchay

Population (2016)
  - Total: 667
- Time zone: UTC+3:30 (IRST)

Senji (Persian: سنجي) (Note: Also romanized as Senjī) is a village in Nazluchay Rural District of Nazlu District in Urmia County, West Azerbaijan province, Iran.

== Demographics ==
=== Population ===
At the time of the 2006 National Census, the village's population was 801 in 125 households. The following census in 2011 counted 787 people in 203 households. The 2016 census measured the population of the village as 667 people in 136 households.
