= Kelisay-e Sir =

Kelisay-e Sir کلیسای سیر
- Village
- Location within Iran
- Coordinates: 37°25′23″N 45°00′29″E
- Country: Iran
- Province: West Azerbaijan
- County: Urmia
- Bakhsh: Central
- Rural District: Baranduz

Population (2006)
  - Total: 39
- Time zone: UTC+3:30 (IRST)
  - Summer (DST): UTC+4:30 (IRDT)

Kelisay-e Sir (Persian: کلیسای سیر, also Romanized as Kelīsāy-e Sīr; also known as Kelīsā-ye Gadik) is a village in Baranduz Rural District, in the Central District of Urmia County, West Azerbaijan Province, Iran. At the 2006 census, its population was 39, in 10 families.
