= Didan =

Didan (Persian: ديدان) may refer to:

- Didan-e Olya
- Didan-e Sofla
