= Dastjerd, West Azerbaijan =

Village in West Azerbaijan province, Iran

Dastjerd Persian: دستجرد
- Village
- Location within Iran
- Coordinates: 37°41′30″N 45°03′34″E
- Country: Iran
- Province: West Azerbaijan
- County: Urmia
- District: Central
- Rural District: Nazluy-e Jonubi

Population (2016)
  - Total: 740
- Time zone: UTC+3:30 (IRST)

Dastjerd (Persian: دستجرد) (Note: In Armenian: Դաստակերտ) is a village in Nazluy-e Jonubi Rural District of the Central District in Urmia County, West Azerbaijan province, Iran.

== Demographics ==
=== Population ===
At the time of the 2006 National Census, the village's population was 732 in 222 households. The following census in 2011 counted 581 people in 189 households. The 2016 census measured the population of the village as 740 people in 242 households.
