= Saatluy-e Beyglar =

Village in West Azerbaijan province, Iran

Saatluy-e Beyglar Persian: ساعتلوي بيگلر
- Village
- Location within Iran
- Coordinates: 37°43′01″N 45°02′33″E
- Country: Iran
- Province: West Azerbaijan
- County: Urmia
- District: Nazlu
- Rural District: Nazluy-e Shomali

Population (2016)
  - Total: 559
- Time zone: UTC+3:30 (IRST)

Saatluy-e Beyglar (Persian: ساعتلوي بيگلر) (Note: Also romanized as Sā‘atlūy-e Beyglar; also known as Sā‘atlū-ye Beyglar) is a village in Nazluy-e Shomali Rural District of Nazlu District in Urmia County, West Azerbaijan province, Iran.

== Demographics ==
=== Population ===
At the time of the 2006 National Census, the village's population was 675 in 196 households. The following census in 2011 counted 614 people in 213 households. The 2016 census measured the population of the village as 559 people in 179 households.
