= Shamlakan =

Village in West Azerbaijan province, Iran

Shamlakan Persian: شملكان
- Village
- Location within Iran
- Coordinates: 37°28′23″N 44°59′32″E
- Country: Iran
- Province: West Azerbaijan
- County: Urmia
- District: Central
- Rural District: Baranduz

Population (2016)
  - Total: 335
- Time zone: UTC+3:30 (IRST)

Shamlakan (Persian: شملكان) (Note: Also romanized as Shamlakān; also known as Shalmakān) is a village in Baranduz Rural District of the Central District in Urmia County, West Azerbaijan province, Iran.

== Demographics ==
=== Population ===
At the time of the 2006 National Census, the village's population was 364 in 79 households. The following census in 2011 counted 312 people in 69 households. The 2016 census measured the population of the village as 335 people in 82 households.
