= Kachal Ali-ye Olya =

Village in West Azerbaijan province, Iran

Kachal Ali-ye Olya Persian: كچل علي عليا
- Village
- Location within Iran
- Coordinates: 37°46′24″N 45°05′53″E
- Country: Iran
- Province: West Azerbaijan
- County: Urmia
- District: Nazlu
- Rural District: Nazluy-e Shomali

Population (2016)
  - Total: 563
- Time zone: UTC+3:30 (IRST)

Kachal Ali-ye Olya (Persian: كچل علي عليا) (Note: Also romanized as Kachal‘alī-ye ‘Olyā; formerly known as Vaqasluy-e Olya (کریم آباد), also romanized as Vaqāşlūy-e ‘Olyā; also known as Vaqāşlū-ye ‘Olyā) is a village in Nazluy-e Shomali Rural District of Nazlu District in Urmia County, West Azerbaijan province, Iran.

== Demographics ==
=== Population ===
At the time of the 2006 National Census, the village's population, as Vaqasluy-e Olya, was 670 in 173 households. The following census in 2011 counted 663 people in 194 households, by which time the village was listed as Kachal Ali-ye Olya. The 2016 census measured the population of the village as 563 people in 180 households.
