= Sari Beygluy-e Musai =

Sari Beygluy-e Musai ساريبيگلوي موسي ي
- Village
- Location within Iran
- Coordinates: 37°28′54″N 45°10′54″E
- Country: Iran
- Province: West Azerbaijan
- County: Urmia
- Bakhsh: Central
- Rural District: Baranduz

Population (2006)
  - Total: 200
- Time zone: UTC+3:30 (IRST)
  - Summer (DST): UTC+4:30 (IRDT)

Sari Beygluy-e Musai (Persian: ساريبيگلوي موسي ي, also Romanized as Sārī Beyglūy-e Mūsá‘ī; also known as Sārī Beyglū) is a village in Baranduz Rural District, in the Central District of Urmia County, West Azerbaijan Province, Iran. At the 2006 census, its population was 200, in 52 families.
