= Chonqeraluy-e Pol =

Village in West Azerbaijan province, Iran

Chonqeraluy-e Pol Persian: چنقرالوي پل
- Village
- Location within Iran
- Coordinates: 37°42′37″N 45°04′05″E
- Country: Iran
- Province: West Azerbaijan
- County: Urmia
- District: Nazlu
- Rural District: Nazluy-e Shomali

Population (2016)
  - Total: 1,594
- Time zone: UTC+3:30 (IRST)

Chonqeraluy-e Pol (Persian: چنقرالوي پل) (Note: Also romanized as Chonqerālūy-e Pol; also known as Chonqerālū-ye Pol) is a village in Nazluy-e Shomali Rural District of Nazlu District in Urmia County, West Azerbaijan province, Iran.

== Demographics ==
=== Population ===
At the time of the 2006 National Census, the village's population was 1,637 in 436 households. The following census in 2011 counted 1,631 people in 510 households. The 2016 census measured the population of the village as 1,594 people in 489 households.
