= Sheykh Sar Mast =

Village in West Azerbaijan province, Iran

Sheykh Sar Mast Persian: شيخ سرمست
- Village
- Location within Iran
- Coordinates: 37°40′11″N 45°03′04″E
- Country: Iran
- Province: West Azerbaijan
- County: Urmia
- District: Central
- Rural District: Nazluy-e Jonubi

Population (2016)
  - Total: 384
- Time zone: UTC+3:30 (IRST)

Sheykh Sar Mast (Persian: شيخ سرمست) (Note: Also romanized as Shaikh Sarmast; also known as Sheikh Sarmes) is a village in Nazluy-e Jonubi Rural District of the Central District in Urmia County, West Azerbaijan province, Iran.

== Demographics ==
=== Population ===
At the time of the 2006 National Census, the village's population was 524 in 139 households. The following census in 2011 counted 423 people in 131 households. The 2016 census measured the population of the village as 384 people in 127 households.
