= Bozveh =

Village in West Azerbaijan province, Iran

Bozveh Persian: بزوه
- Village
- Location within Iran
- Coordinates: 37°30′32″N 45°01′45″E
- Country: Iran
- Province: West Azerbaijan
- County: Urmia
- District: Central
- Rural District: Baranduz

Population (2016)
  - Total: 550
- Time zone: UTC+3:30 (IRST)

Bozveh (Persian: بزوه) is a village in Baranduz Rural District of the Central District in Urmia County, West Azerbaijan province, Iran.

== Demographics ==
=== Population ===
At the time of the 2006 National Census, the village's population was 353 in 103 households. The following census in 2011 counted 630 people in 183 households. The 2016 census measured the population of the village as 550 people in 167 households.
