= Chichakluy =

Chichakluy (Persian: چيچكلوي) may refer to:

- Chichakluy-e Bash Qaleh
- Chichakluy-e Hajji Aqa
