= Jorni =

Village in West Azerbaijan province, Iran

Jorni Persian: جرني
- Village
- Location within Iran
- Coordinates: 37°22′55″N 44°57′03″E
- Country: Iran
- Province: West Azerbaijan
- County: Urmia
- District: Central
- Rural District: Baranduz

Population (2016)
  - Total: 357
- Time zone: UTC+3:30 (IRST)

Jorni (Persian: جرني) (Note: Also romanized as Jornī; formerly known as Jowrni (جورنی), also romanized as Jowrnī) is a village in Baranduz Rural District of the Central District in Urmia County, West Azerbaijan province, Iran.

== Demographics ==
=== Population ===
At the time of the 2006 National Census, the village's population, as Jowrni, was 366 in 62 households. The following census in 2011 counted 253 people in 57 households, by which time the village was listed as Jorni. The 2016 census measured the population of the village as 357 people in 90 households.
