= Qarah Aghaj, Urmia =

Village in West Azerbaijan province, Iran

Qarah Aghaj Persian: قره اغاج
- Village
- Location within Iran
- Coordinates: 37°28′21″N 45°08′45″E
- Country: Iran
- Province: West Azerbaijan
- County: Urmia
- District: Central
- Rural District: Baranduzchay-ye Shomali

Population (2016)
  - Total: 1,505
- Time zone: UTC+3:30 (IRST)

Qarah Aghaj (Persian: قره اغاج, romanized: Qarah Āghāj; Syriac: Qārāghāj) (Note: Also known as Karaghadj or Qareh Āghāj.) is a village in, and the capital of, Baranduzchay-ye Shomali Rural District in the Central District of Urmia County, West Azerbaijan province, Iran.

== History ==
In 1862, Qārāghāj was inhabited by 43 Church of the East Christian families who were served by the Church of Beni Shmūni but had no priest, according to the Russian archimandrite Sophoniah. There were 30 Church of the East Christian families at Qārāghāj with 1 priest and 1 church, as per Edward Lewes Cutts. Basil Nikitin recorded that the village was populated by Christians and Muslims just before the First World War. Prior to the First World War, there were 70 Assyrian houses at Qārāghāj, as per the list presented by Agha Petros to the Lausanne Peace Conference in 1922. It was located in the Baranduz District.

== Demographics ==
=== Population ===
At the time of the 2006 National Census, the village's population was 1,554 in 413 households. The following census in 2011 counted 1,246 people in 411 households. The 2016 census measured the population of the village as 1,505 people in 492 households.

== Bibliography ==
- Gaunt, David (2006). Massacres, Resistance, Protectors: Muslim-Christian Relations in Eastern Anatolia during World War I. Gorgias Press.
- Wilmshurst, David (2000). The Ecclesiastical Organisation of the Church of the East, 1318–1913 (PDF). Peeters Publishers.
