= Ghaffar Behi =

Village in West Azerbaijan province, Iran

Ghaffar Behi Persian: غفاربهی
- Village
- Location within Iran
- Coordinates: 37°38′19″N 45°06′10″E
- Country: Iran
- Province: West Azerbaijan
- County: Urmia
- District: Central
- Rural District: Nazluy-e Jonubi

Population (2016)
  - Total: 356
- Time zone: UTC+3:30 (IRST)

Ghaffar Behi (Persian: غفاربهی) (Note: Also romanized as Ghaffār Behī) is a village in Nazluy-e Jonubi Rural District of the Central District in Urmia County, West Azerbaijan province, Iran.

== Demographics ==
=== Population ===
At the time of the 2006 National Census, the village's population was 458 in 106 households. The following census in 2011 counted 415 people in 124 households. The 2016 census measured the population of the village as 356 people in 121 households.
