= Sheykhlar Mazari =

Village in West Azerbaijan province, Iran

Sheykhlar Mazari Persian: شيخ لر مزاري
- Village
- Location within Iran
- Coordinates: 37°26′15″N 45°02′44″E
- Country: Iran
- Province: West Azerbaijan
- County: Urmia
- District: Central
- Rural District: Baranduz

Population (2016)
  - Total: 409
- Time zone: UTC+3:30 (IRST)

Sheykhlar Mazari (Persian: شيخ لر مزاري) (Note: Also romanized as Sheykhlar Mazārī; formerly known as Sheykh Mazari (شیخ مزاری), also romanized as Sheykh Mazārī) is a village in Baranduz Rural District of the Central District in Urmia County, West Azerbaijan province, Iran.

== Demographics ==
=== Population ===
At the time of the 2006 National Census, the village's population, as Sheykh Mazari, was 336 in 65 households. The following census in 2011 counted 371 people in 96 households, by which time the village was listed as Sheykhlar Mazari. The 2016 census measured the population of the village as 409 people in 101 households.
