= Abajaluy-e Sofla =

Village in West Azerbaijan province, Iran

Abajaluy-e Sofla اباجالوي سفلي
- Village
- Location within Iran
- Coordinates: 37°43′36″N 45°09′59″E
- Country: Iran
- Province: West Azerbaijan
- County: Urmia
- District: Nazlu
- Rural District: Tala Tappeh

Population (2016)
  - Total: 133
- Time zone: UTC+3:30 (IRST)
- Climate: BSk

Abajaluy-e Sofla (Persian: اباجالوي سفلي) (Note: Also romanized as Ābājālūy-e Soflá; also known as Ābājālū-ye Soflá and Abājalū-ye Soflá) is a village in Tala Tappeh Rural District of Nazlu District in Urmia County, West Azerbaijan province, Iran.

== Demographics ==
=== Population ===
At the time of the 2006 National Census, the village's population was 192 in 62 households. The following census in 2011 counted 166 people in 53 households. The 2016 census measured the population of the village as 133 people in 49 households.
