= Khodaverdi Khan Kandi =

Village in West Azerbaijan province, Iran

Khodaverdi Khan Kandi خداوردي خان كندي
- Village
- Location within Iran
- Coordinates: 37°42′27″N 45°09′18″E
- Country: Iran
- Province: West Azerbaijan
- County: Urmia
- District: Nazlu
- Rural District: Tala Tappeh

Population (2016)
  - Total: 249
- Time zone: UTC+3:30 (IRST)

Khodaverdi Khan Kandi (Persian: خداوردي خان كندي) (Note: Also romanized as Khodāverdī Khān Kandī and Khodāverdīkhān Kandī; also known as Ādeh-e Morteẕápāshā) is a village in Tala Tappeh Rural District of Nazlu District in Urmia County, West Azerbaijan province, Iran.

== Demographics ==
=== Population ===
At the time of the 2006 National Census, the village's population was 211 in 60 households. The following census in 2011 counted 155 people in 51 households. The 2016 census measured the population of the village as 249 people in 83 households.
