= Band, Iran =

Village in West Azerbaijan province, Iran

Band Persian: بند
- Village
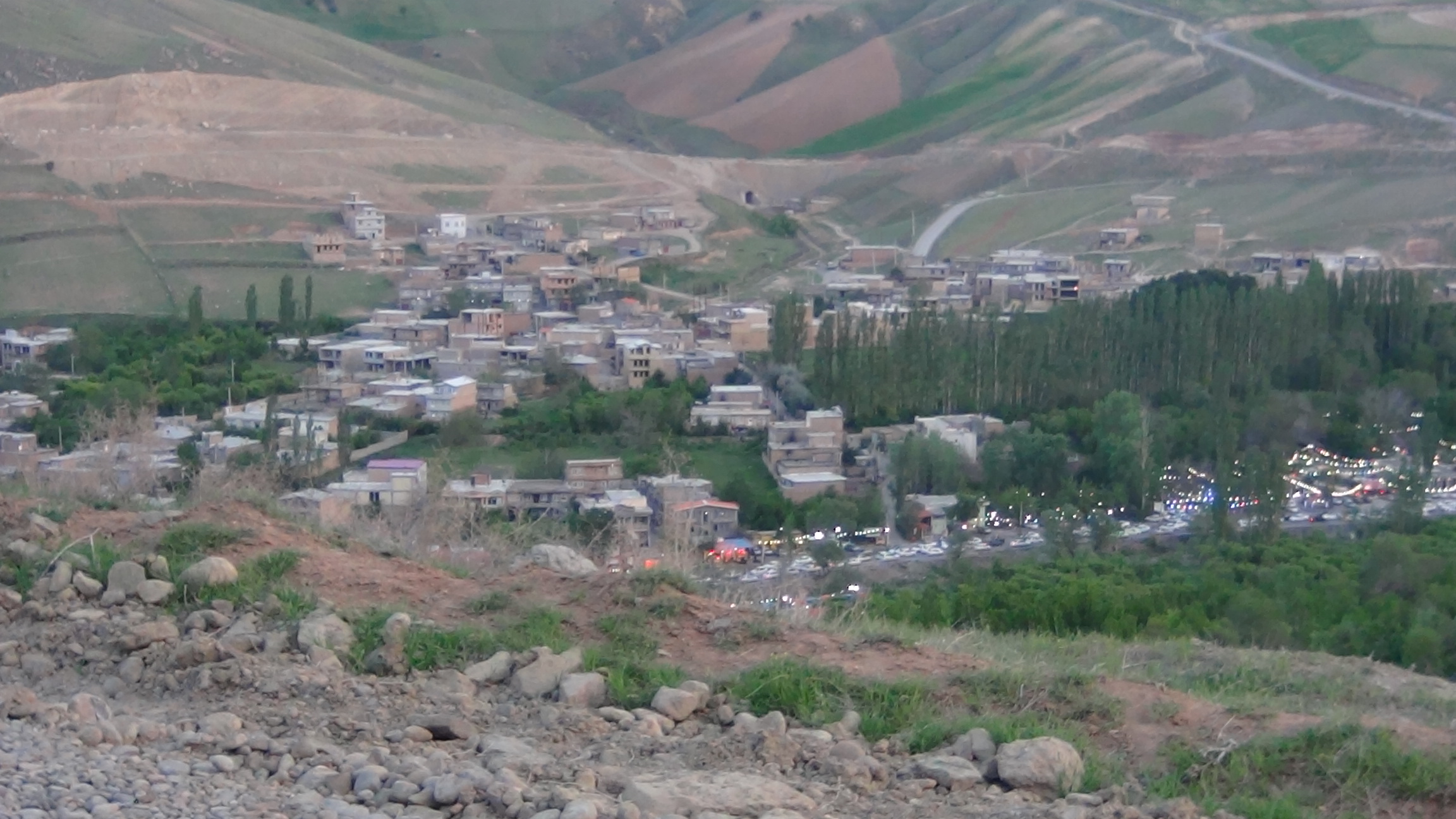
- The village of Band

- Location within Iran
- Coordinates: 37°29′51″N 45°00′00″E
- Country: Iran
- Province: West Azerbaijan
- County: Urmia
- District: Central
- Rural District: Baranduz

Population (2016)
  - Total: 4,769
- Time zone: UTC+3:30 (IRST)

Band (Persian: بند) (Note: Also known as Darband) is a village in Baranduz Rural District of the Central District in Urmia County, West Azerbaijan province, Iran.

== Demographics ==
=== Population ===
At the time of the 2006 National Census, the village's population was 3,888 in 872 households. The following census in 2011 counted 4,092 people in 1,081 households. The 2016 census measured the population of the village as 4,769 people in 1,281 households. It was the most populous village in its rural district.
