= Borhanlu =

Village in West Azerbaijan province, Iran

Borhanlu Persian: برهانلو
- Village
- Location within Iran
- Coordinates: 37°30′03″N 45°08′51″E
- Country: Iran
- Province: West Azerbaijan
- County: Urmia
- District: Central
- Rural District: Baranduzchay-ye Shomali

Population (2016)
  - Total: 433
- Time zone: UTC+3:30 (IRST)

Borhanlu (Persian: برهانلو) (Note: Also romanized as Borhānlū) is a village in Baranduzchay-ye Shomali Rural District of the Central District in Urmia County, West Azerbaijan province, Iran.

== Demographics ==
=== Population ===
At the time of the 2006 National Census, the village's population was 370 in 104 households. The following census in 2011 counted 344 people in 115 households. The 2016 census measured the population of the village as 433 people in 141 households.
