= Qotlu =

Village in West Azerbaijan province, Iran

Qotlu Persian: قطلو
- Village
- Location within Iran
- Coordinates: 37°30′24″N 45°08′18″E
- Country: Iran
- Province: West Azerbaijan
- County: Urmia
- District: Central
- Rural District: Baranduzchay-ye Shomali

Population (2016)
  - Total: 736
- Time zone: UTC+3:30 (IRST)

Qotlu (Persian: قطلو) (Note: Also romanized as Qoţlū) is a village in Baranduzchay-ye Shomali Rural District of the Central District in Urmia County, West Azerbaijan province, Iran.

== Demographics ==
=== Population ===
At the time of the 2006 National Census, the village's population was 716 in 195 households. The following census in 2011 counted 616 people in 183 households. The 2016 census measured the population of the village as 736 people in 233 households.
