= Faqih Beyglu =

Village in West Azerbaijan province, Iran

Faqih Beyglu Persian: فقيه بيگلو
- Village
- Location within Iran
- Coordinates: 37°27′40″N 45°11′00″E
- Country: Iran
- Province: West Azerbaijan
- County: Urmia
- District: Central
- Rural District: Baranduzchay-ye Shomali

Population (2016)
  - Total: 496
- Time zone: UTC+3:30 (IRST)

Faqih Beyglu (Persian: فقيه بيگلو) (Note: Also romanized as Faqīh Beyglū) is a village in Baranduzchay-ye Shomali Rural District of the Central District in Urmia County, West Azerbaijan province, Iran.

== Demographics ==
=== Population ===
At the time of the 2006 National Census, the village's population was 391 in 99 households. The following census in 2011 counted 410 people in 129 households. The 2016 census measured the population of the village as 496 people in 152 households.
