= Varmazyar, Urmia =

Village in West Azerbaijan province, Iran

Varmazyar Persian: ورمزيار
- Village
- Location within Iran
- Coordinates: 37°23′08″N 45°03′18″E
- Country: Iran
- Province: West Azerbaijan
- County: Urmia
- District: Central
- Rural District: Baranduz

Population (2016)
  - Total: 378
- Time zone: UTC+3:30 (IRST)

Varmazyar (Persian: ورمزيار) (Note: Also romanized as Varmaziar and Varmazyār) is a village in Baranduz Rural District of the Central District in Urmia County, West Azerbaijan province, Iran.

== Demographics ==
=== Population ===
At the time of the 2006 National Census, the village's population was 292 in 53 households. The following census in 2011 counted 373 people in 94 households. The 2016 census measured the population of the village as 378 people in 91 households.
