= Janvislu =

Village in West Azerbaijan province, Iran

Janvislu Persian: جانويسلو
- Village
- Location within Iran
- Coordinates: 37°30′12″N 45°01′41″E
- Country: Iran
- Province: West Azerbaijan
- County: Urmia
- District: Central
- Rural District: Baranduz

Population (2016)
  - Total: 481
- Time zone: UTC+3:30 (IRST)

Janvislu (Persian: جانويسلو) (Note: Also romanized as Jānvīslū; also known as Jāneslū, Janveslou, and Jānveslū) is a village in Baranduz Rural District of the Central District in Urmia County, West Azerbaijan province, Iran.

== Demographics ==
=== Population ===
At the time of the 2006 National Census, the village's population was 408 in 109 households. The following census in 2011 counted 419 people in 110 households. The 2016 census measured the population of the village as 481 people in 141 households.
