= Khataylu =

Village in West Azerbaijan province, Iran

Khataylu Persian: خطايلو
- Village
- Location within Iran
- Coordinates: 37°26′30″N 45°05′37″E
- Country: Iran
- Province: West Azerbaijan
- County: Urmia
- District: Central
- Rural District: Baranduz

Population (2016)
  - Total: 419
- Time zone: UTC+3:30 (IRST)

Khataylu (Persian: خطايلو) (Note: Also romanized as Khaţāylū) is a village in Baranduz Rural District of the Central District in Urmia County, West Azerbaijan province, Iran.

== Demographics ==
=== Population ===
At the time of the 2006 National Census, the village's population was 512 in 127 households. The following census in 2011 counted 418 people in 122 households. The 2016 census measured the population of the village as 419 people in 119 households.
