= Tazeh Kand-e Afshar =

Village in West Azerbaijan province, Iran

Tazeh Kand-e Afshar Persian: تازه كندافشار
- Village
- Location within Iran
- Coordinates: 37°37′58″N 45°03′38″E
- Country: Iran
- Province: West Azerbaijan
- County: Urmia
- District: Central
- Rural District: Nazluy-e Jonubi

Population (2016)
  - Total: 489
- Time zone: UTC+3:30 (IRST)

Tazeh Kand-e Afshar (Persian: تازه كندافشار) (Note: Also romanized as Tāzeh Kand-e Afshār; also known as Tāzehkand-e Gardābād) is a village in Nazluy-e Jonubi Rural District of the Central District in Urmia County, West Azerbaijan province, Iran.

== Demographics ==
=== Population ===
At the time of the 2006 National Census, the village's population was 304 in 88 households. The following census in 2011 counted 440 people in 102 households. The 2016 census measured the population of the village as 489 people in 123 households.
