= Marangaluy-e Kuchek =

Marangaluy-e Kuchek مرنگلوی کوچک
- Village
- Location within Iran
- Coordinates: 37°37′59″N 45°05′33″E
- Country: Iran
- Province: West Azerbaijan
- County: Urmia
- Bakhsh: Central
- Rural District: Nazluy-ye Jonubi

Population (2006)
  - Total: 87
- Time zone: UTC+3:30 (IRST)
  - Summer (DST): UTC+4:30 (IRDT)

Marangaluy-e Kuchek (Persian: مرنگلوی کوچک, also Romanized as Marangalūy-e Kūchek; also known as Marangalū-ye Kūchek and Marāngalū-ye Kūchek) is a village in Nazluy-ye Jonubi Rural District, in the Central District of Urmia County, West Azerbaijan Province, Iran. At the 2006 census, its population was 87, in 26 families.
