= Baglar =

Baglar may refer to:

- Bağlar (disambiguation)
- Biglar (disambiguation)
