= Heydarluy-e Beyglar =

Heydarluy-e Beyglar حيدرلوي بيگلر
- Village
- Location within Iran
- Coordinates: 37°43′21″N 45°05′49″E
- Country: Iran
- Province: West Azerbaijan
- County: Urmia
- Bakhsh: Nazlu
- Rural District: Nazlu-e Shomali

Population (2006)
  - Total: 379
- Time zone: UTC+3:30 (IRST)
  - Summer (DST): UTC+4:30 (IRDT)

Heydarluy-e Beyglar (Persian: حيدرلوي بيگلر, also Romanized as Ḩeydarlūy-e Beyglar; also known as Bīglar, Ḩeydarlū-ye Beyglar, and Ḩeydarlū-ye Bīglar) is a village in Nazlu-e Shomali Rural District, Nazlu District, Urmia County, West Azerbaijan Province, Iran. At the 2006 census, its population was 379, in 116 families.
