= Adeh-ye Bozorg, Iran =

Village in West Azerbaijan province, Iran

Adeh-ye Bozorg آده بزرگ
- Village
- Location within Iran
- Coordinates: 37°42′11″N 45°11′03″E
- Country: Iran
- Province: West Azerbaijan
- County: Urmia
- District: Nazlu
- Rural District: Tala Tappeh

Population (2016)
  - Total: 102
- Time zone: UTC+3:30 (IRST)
- Climate: BSk

Adeh-ye Bozorg (Persian: آده بزرگ, romanized: Ādeh-ye Bozorg; Syriac: ʿĀdā) (Note: Formerly known as Adeh (اده), also romanized as Ādeh; also known as Ada.) is a village in Tala Tappeh Rural District of Nazlu District in Urmia County, West Azerbaijan province, Iran.

There is a Presbyterian Evangelical church at ʿĀdā. The village has at least one Armenian church.

== History ==
The Church of St Daniel at ʿĀdā is believed to date to between the 4th and 7th century AD. The scribe Tamraz of ʿĀdā copied a manuscript in 1698. The Catholic metropolitan Shemʿōn from ʿĀdā was sent to India in 1701 by the Vatican to consecrate a Latin vicar apostolic for the Chaldeans of Malabar and died in India in 1720.

The Church of St John the Baptist at ʿĀdā was constructed in the late 19th century. In 1862, ʿĀdā was inhabited by 184 Church of the East Christian families and was served by the Church of Mār Daniel and the Church of Mār Yōḥannān but did not have a priest, according to the Russian archimandrite Sophoniah. There were 126 Church of the East Christian families with 2 churches and 3 priests at ʿĀdā in 1877, as per Edward Lewes Cutts. The scribe Pākō, son of Bābū, son of Amrīs, of ʿĀdā copied a manuscript in 1898.

Basil Nikitin, the Russian consul at Urmia, recorded that the village was populated by Christians and Muslims just before the First World War. There were 700 Chaldean Catholics at ʿĀdā in 1913 with 3 priests and 1 church as part of the Chaldean Catholic Archeparchy of Urmia. Prior to the First World War, there were 300 Assyrian houses at ʿĀdā, as per the list presented by Agha Petros to the Lausanne Peace Conference in 1922. It was located in the Anzel district.

== Ecclesiastical history ==
A traditionalist Church of the East bishop of ʿĀdā named Joseph with responsibility only for that village is attested in 1842, 1854, 1861, and 1880. The bishop Joseph of ʿĀdā, who had converted to Catholicism, was mentioned as a Catholic bishop in a letter addressed to him and Gīwārgīs Augustine Barshīnā, metropolitan of Salmas, from Pope Pius IX in 1862. He is mentioned again in 1877 by Edward Lewes Cutts and he may have ceased to have been a Catholic by 1880.

The diocese of ʿĀdā was absorbed into the diocese of Anzel upon the death of its bishop in the second half of the 19th century.

== Demographics ==
=== Population ===
At the time of the 2006 National Census, the village's population, as Adeh, was 151 in 41 households. The following census in 2011 counted 68 people in 26 households, by which time the village was listed as Adeh-ye Bozorg. The 2016 census measured the population of the village as 102 people in 36 households.

== Notable people ==
- Bob Miner; both parents were Iranian Assyrians from Adeh.

== Bibliography ==
- Al-Jeloo, Nicholas (2010). "Evidence in Stone and Wood: The Assyrian/Syriac History and Heritage of the Urmia Region in Iran, as Reconstructed from Epigraphic Evidence". Parole de l’Orient. 35: 1–27.
- Al-Jeloo, Nicholas (2015). "Persian Christians: Assyrian art and architecture of Urmia as an example of regional cultural expression". Parole de l’Orient. 40: 13–27.
- Amurian, Andre; Kasheff, Manouchehr (1986). "ARMENIANS OF MODERN IRAN". In Yarshater, Ehsan (ed.). Encyclopædia Iranica (Online ed.). Encyclopædia Iranica Foundation.
- Fiey, Jean Maurice (1993). Pour un Oriens Christianus Novus: Répertoire des diocèses syriaques orientaux et occidentaux (in French).
- Gaunt, David (2006). Massacres, Resistance, Protectors: Muslim-Christian Relations in Eastern Anatolia during World War I. Gorgias Press.
- Hellot-Bellier, Florence (2017). "The Resistance of Urmia Assyrians to Violence at the Beginning of the Twentieth Century". In David Gaunt; Naures Atto; Soner O. Barthoma (eds.). Let Them Not Return: Sayfo – The Genocide against the Assyrian, Syriac and Chaldean Christians in the Ottoman Empire (PDF). pp. 70–99.
- Wilmshurst, David (2000). The Ecclesiastical Organisation of the Church of the East, 1318–1913 (PDF). Peeters Publishers.
