= Owsaluy-e Kazem =

Village in West Azerbaijan province, Iran

Owsaluy-e Kazem اوصالوي كاظم
- Village
- Location within Iran
- Coordinates: 37°42′38″N 45°12′44″E
- Country: Iran
- Province: West Azerbaijan
- County: Urmia
- District: Nazlu
- Rural District: Tala Tappeh

Population (2016)
  - Total: 229
- Time zone: UTC+3:30 (IRST)

Owsaluy-e Kazem (Persian: اوصالوي كاظم) (Note: Also romanized as Owşālūy-e Kāz̧em; also known as Owşālū-ye Kāz̧em and Ūşālū-ye Kāz̧em) is a village in Tala Tappeh Rural District of Nazlu District in Urmia County, West Azerbaijan province, Iran.

== Demographics ==
=== Population ===
At the time of the 2006 National Census, the village's population was 227 in 80 households. The following census in 2011 counted 203 people in 63 households. The 2016 census measured the population of the village as 229 people in 77 households.
