= Isa Luy-e Allah Verdi =

Village in West Azerbaijan province, Iran

Isa Luy-e Allah Verdi عيسي لوي الله وردي
- Village
- Location within Iran
- Coordinates: 37°42′46″N 45°12′51″E
- Country: Iran
- Province: West Azerbaijan
- County: Urmia
- District: Nazlu
- Rural District: Tala Tappeh

Population (2016)
  - Total: 158
- Time zone: UTC+3:30 (IRST)

Isa Luy-e Allah Verdi (Persian: عيسي لوي الله وردي) (Note: Formerly known as Owsaluy-e Allahverdi Khan (اوصالوي الهوردي خان), also romanized as Owşālūy-e Allāhverdī Khān; also known as Owşālū-ye Allāhverdī Khān and Ūşālū-ye Allāhverdī) is a village in Tala Tappeh Rural District of Nazlu District in Urmia County, West Azerbaijan province, Iran.

== Demographics ==
=== Population ===
At the time of the 2006 National Census, the village's population, as Owsaluy-e Allahverdi Khan, was 284 in 87 households. The following census in 2011 counted 214 people in 68 households, by which time the village was listed as Isa Luy-e Allah Verdi. The 2016 census measured the population of the village as 158 people in 65 households.
