= Gazanehkesh =

Village in West Azerbaijan province, Iran

Gazanehkesh Persian: گزنه كش
- Village
- Location within Iran
- Coordinates: 37°23′02″N 44°59′39″E
- Country: Iran
- Province: West Azerbaijan
- County: Urmia
- District: Central
- Rural District: Baranduz

Population (2016)
  - Total: 329
- Time zone: UTC+3:30 (IRST)

Gazanehkesh (Persian: گزنه كش) is a village in Baranduz Rural District of the Central District in Urmia County, West Azerbaijan province, Iran.

== Demographics ==
=== Population ===
At the time of the 2006 National Census, the village's population was 256 in 51 households. The following census in 2011 counted 282 people in 68 households. The 2016 census measured the population of the village as 329 people in 79 households.
