= Didan-e Olya =

Didan-e Olya ديدان عليا
- Village
- Location within Iran
- Coordinates: 37°26′12″N 45°06′28″E
- Country: Iran
- Province: West Azerbaijan
- County: Urmia
- Bakhsh: Central
- Rural District: Baranduz

Population (2006)
  - Total: 198
- Time zone: UTC+3:30 (IRST)
  - Summer (DST): UTC+4:30 (IRDT)

Didan-e Olya (Persian: ديدان عليا, also Romanized as Dīdān-e ‘Olyā; also known as Dīdān-e Bālā) is a village in Baranduz Rural District, in the Central District of Urmia County, West Azerbaijan Province, Iran. At the 2006 census, its population was 198, in 48 families.
