= Heydarlu, Urmia =

Heydarlu حيدرلو
- Village
- Location within Iran
- Coordinates: 37°28′29″N 45°02′46″E
- Country: Iran
- Province: West Azerbaijan
- County: Urmia
- Bakhsh: Central
- Rural District: Baranduz

Population (2006)
  - Total: 238
- Time zone: UTC+3:30 (IRST)
  - Summer (DST): UTC+4:30 (IRDT)

Heydarlu (Persian: حيدرلو, also Romanized as Ḩeydarlū; also known as Ḩeydarlū-ye Sīr) is a village in Baranduz Rural District, in the Central District of Urmia County, West Azerbaijan Province, Iran. At the 2006 census, its population was 238, in 64 families.
