= Ashiq Yusuf Ohanes =

Iranian poet (1927–2019)

Ashiq Yusuf Ohanes (8 August 1927–2019), also known as Yusuf or Yusufî, was an ashik of the Azerbaijani language from Iran. He was born to an Assyrian family with a long line of ashiks in Dizaj-e Takyeh in West Azerbaijan, Iran. His father and grandfather were Ashiq Yakub and Ashiq Isho, respectively. According to Yusuf Ohanes's own account, the saz he played was crafted by his grandfather around 1854. He started practicing the instrument when he was 2 years old, mastering it at 12. He had 5 siblings (2 brothers, 3 sisters), three of whom were able to play saz and sing. Yusuf Ohanes became an ashik upon his father's request, who was one for 63 years. His father died at the age of 83, when he was 15. Yusuf Ohanes then went to Urmia to learn the profession from his father's friend Ashiq Ferhad, completing his education when he was 17. Yusuf Ohanes had 6 daughters and a son. He mentored 4 ashiks: Ashiq Mohammad Ali Mahmudi, Ashiq Reza Puyende, who were Karapapakhs, Ashiq Zulfali, who was Azerbaijani, and Ashiq Antranik, who was Armenian. Yusuf Ohanes also acted in various movies, such as Savalan, in which he became Koroghlu.
