= Arablu, West Azerbaijan =

Arablu عربلو
- Village
- Location within Iran
- Coordinates: 37°24′10″N 45°15′00″E
- Country: Iran
- Province: West Azerbaijan
- County: Urmia
- Bakhsh: Central
- Rural District: Torkaman

Population (2006)
  - Total: 190
- Time zone: UTC+3:30 (IRST)
  - Summer (DST): UTC+4:30 (IRDT)

Arablu (Persian: عربلو, also Romanized as ‘Arablū) is a village in Torkaman Rural District, in the Central District of Urmia County, West Azerbaijan Province, Iran. At the 2006 census, its population was 190, in 60 families.
