= Didan-e Sofla =

Village in West Azerbaijan province, Iran

Didan-e Sofla Persian: ديدان سفلي
- Village
- Location within Iran
- Coordinates: 37°25′34″N 45°07′33″E
- Country: Iran
- Province: West Azerbaijan
- County: Urmia
- District: Central
- Rural District: Baranduz

Population (2016)
  - Total: 376
- Time zone: UTC+3:30 (IRST)

Didan-e Sofla (Persian: ديدان سفلي) (Note: Also romanized as Dīdān-e Soflá; also known as Dīdān-e Ḩoseynī (ديدان حسيني)) is a village in Baranduz Rural District of the Central District in Urmia County, West Azerbaijan province, Iran.

== Demographics ==
=== Population ===
At the time of the 2006 National Census, the village's population was 680 in 165 households. The following census in 2011 counted 362 people in 105 households. The 2016 census measured the population of the village as 376 people in 117 households.
