= Chichakluy-e Hajji Aqa =

Village in West Azerbaijan province, Iran

Chichakluy-e Hajji Aqa Persian: چیچکلوی حاجی‌آقا
- Village
- Location within Iran
- Coordinates: 37°37′22″N 45°05′28″E
- Country: Iran
- Province: West Azerbaijan
- County: Urmia
- District: Central
- Rural District: Nazluy-e Jonubi

Population (2016)
  - Total: 152
- Time zone: UTC+3:30 (IRST)

Chichakluy-e Hajji Aqa (Persian: چیچکلوی حاجی‌آقا) (Note: Also romanized as Chīchaklūy-e Ḩājjī Āqā; also known as Chīchaklū-ye Ḩājjīāqā and Chīchaklū-ye Ḩājjī Āqā) is a village in Nazluy-e Jonubi Rural District of the Central District in Urmia County, West Azerbaijan province, Iran.

== Demographics ==
=== Population ===
At the time of the 2006 National Census, the village's population was 160 in 39 households. The following census in 2011 counted 143 people in 42 households. The 2016 census measured the population of the village as 152 people in 50 households.
