= Sari Beygluy-e Araliq =

Sari Beygluy-e Araliq ساری‌بیگلوی ارالیق
- Village
- Location within Iran
- Coordinates: 37°41′23″N 45°07′31″E
- Country: Iran
- Province: West Azerbaijan
- County: Urmia
- Bakhsh: Central
- Rural District: Bash Qaleh

Population (2006)
  - Total: 145
- Time zone: UTC+3:30 (IRST)
  - Summer (DST): UTC+4:30 (IRDT)

Sari Beygluy-e Araliq (Persian: ساری‌بیگلوی ارالیق, also Romanized as Sārī Beyglūy-e Ārālīq; also known as Sārī Beyglar-e Ārāleq and Sārī Beyglū-ye Ārāleq) is a village in Bash Qaleh Rural District, in the Central District of Urmia County, West Azerbaijan Province, Iran. At the 2006 census, its population was 145, in 40 families.
