= Nushin =

City in West Azerbaijan province, Iran

Nushin Persian: نوشين
- City
- Location within Iran
- Coordinates: 37°44′02″N 45°02′58″E
- Country: Iran
- Province: West Azerbaijan
- County: Urmia
- District: Nazlu
- Established as a city: 1993

Population (2016)
  - Total: 8,380
- Time zone: UTC+3:30 (IRST)

Nushin (Persian: نوشين) (Note: Also romanized as Nūshīn; also known as Nūshīn Shahr) is a city in, and the capital of, Nazlu District in Urmia County, West Azerbaijan province, Iran. It also serves as the administrative center for Nazlu-ye Shomali Rural District. The village of Nushin was converted to a city in 1993.

== Demographics ==
=== Population ===
At the time of the 2006 National Census, the city's population was 6,731 in 1,626 households. The following census in 2011 counted 7,183 people in 1,961 households. The 2016 census measured the population of the city as 8,380 people in 2,311 households.
