= Biglar =

Biglar or Beyglar (Persian: بيگلر) may refer to:

- Biglar, Qazvin
- Biglar, Razavi Khorasan
- Biglar, West Azerbaijan
