= Saatluy Kuh =

Village in West Azerbaijan province, Iran

Saatluy Kuh Persian: ساعتلوی کوه
- Village
- Location within Iran
- Coordinates: 37°25′10″N 45°02′32″E
- Country: Iran
- Province: West Azerbaijan
- County: Urmia
- District: Central
- Rural District: Baranduz

Population (2016)
  - Total: 371
- Time zone: UTC+3:30 (IRST)

Saatluy Kuh (Persian: ساعتلوی کوه) (Note: Also romanized as Sā‘atlūy Kūh; also known as Sā‘atlū Kūh, Sā‘atlūy Dāgh, Sā‘atlū-ye Dāgh, Sā‘atlū-ye Kūh, and Sā‘tlū) is a village in Baranduz Rural District of the Central District in Urmia County, West Azerbaijan province, Iran.

== Demographics ==
=== Population ===
At the time of the 2006 National Census, the village's population was 328 in 72 households. The following census in 2011 counted 308 people in 77 households. The 2016 census measured the population of the village as 371 people in 95 households.
