= Chonqeraluy-e Yekan =

Village in West Azerbaijan province, Iran

Chonqeraluy-e Yekan Persian: چنقرالوی یکان
- Village
- Location within Iran
- Coordinates: 37°39′03″N 45°03′49″E
- Country: Iran
- Province: West Azerbaijan
- County: Urmia
- District: Central
- Rural District: Nazluy-e Jonubi

Population (2016)
  - Total: 1,191
- Time zone: UTC+3:30 (IRST)

Chonqeraluy-e Yekan (Persian: چنقرالوی یکان) (Note: Also romanized as Chonqerālūy-e Yekān; also known as Chonqerālū-ye Yekān, Chownqorālū-ye Yekān, and Chūnqorālūy-e Yekān) is a village in Nazluy-e Jonubi Rural District of the Central District in Urmia County, West Azerbaijan province, Iran.

== Demographics ==
=== Population ===
At the time of the 2006 National Census, the village's population was 1,403 in 428 households. The following census in 2011 counted 1,348 people in 441 households. The 2016 census measured the population of the village as 1,191 people in 428 households. It was the most populous village in its rural district.
