= Sopurghan =

Village in West Azerbaijan province, Iran

Sopurghan سپورغان
- Village
- Location within Iran
- Coordinates: 37°45′09″N 45°11′56″E
- Country: Iran
- Province: West Azerbaijan
- County: Urmia
- District: Nazlu
- Rural District: Tala Tappeh

Population (2016)
  - Total: 216
- Time zone: UTC+3:30 (IRST)

Sopurghan (Persian: سپورغان) (Note: Also romanized as Sopūrghān; also known as Separghān, Soporghān, and Supurgan; in Armenian: Սուփուրղան; Syriac: ܣܦܘܪܓܢ) is a village in Tala Tappeh Rural District of Nazlu District in Urmia County, West Azerbaijan province, Iran.

== Etymology ==
According to Vladimir Minorsky, the name of this village is derived from the Mongolian word suburghan, meaning a stupa.

== History ==
The earliest mention of Sopurghan is found in a letter to Pope Pius IV in 1562. The village is mentioned again in a manuscript donated to a church in Jerusalem in 1612.

Evidence from tombstones in the village cemetery show Assyrian presence in the village as early as 668 AD. In 1840, American Protestant missionaries built a primary school in the region. In 1862, a Russian survey showed 172 families and 2 priests living in the village. In 1883, a missionary established girls' school in the village, and in 1887, and Anglican mission established a Middle School for boys below 17.

== Demographics ==
=== Population ===
At the time of the 2006 National Census, the village's population was 243 in 71 households. The following census in 2011 counted 84 people in 25 households. The 2016 census measured the population of the village as 216 people in 75 households.

== Location ==
Sopurghan is 26 kilometres northeast of the city of Urmia and 2 kilometres from the edge of Lake Urmia.
