= Arabluy-e Bisheh =

Arabluy-e Bisheh عربلوی بیشه
- Village
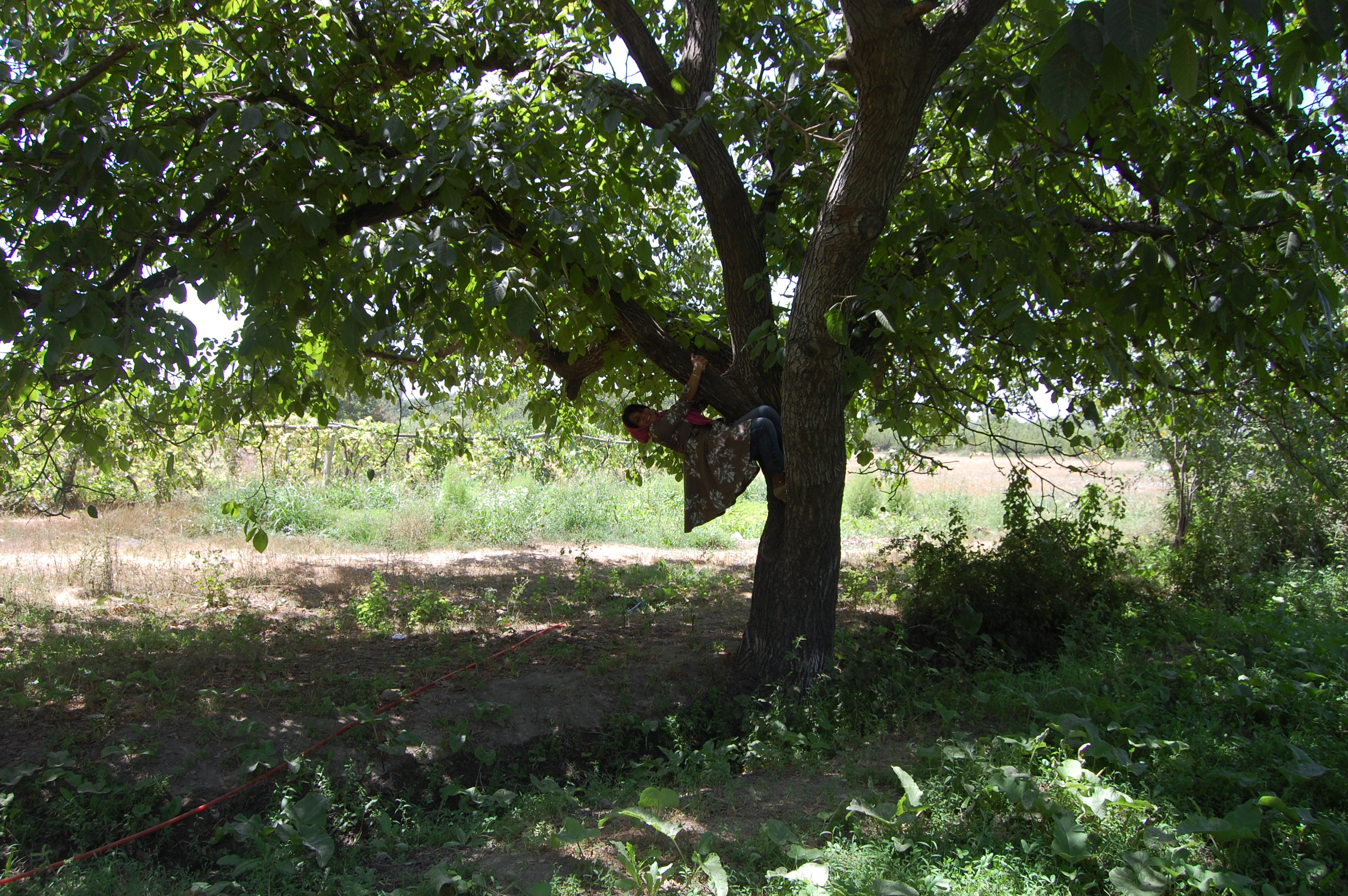
- Arabloi Bisheh, West Azerbaijan Province.

- Location within Iran
- Coordinates: 37°41′11″N 45°02′35″E
- Country: Iran
- Province: West Azerbaijan
- County: Urmia
- Bakhsh: Central
- Rural District: Nazluy-ye Jonubi

Population (2006)
  - Total: 280
- Time zone: UTC+3:30 (IRST)
  - Summer (DST): UTC+4:30 (IRDT)

Arabluy-e Bisheh (Persian: عربلوی بیشه, also Romanized as ‘Arablūy-e Bīsheh; also known as ‘Arablū-ye Bīsheh) is a village in Nazluy-ye Jonubi Rural District, in the Central District of Urmia County, West Azerbaijan Province, Iran. At the 2006 census, its population was 280, in 89 families.
