= Andrew David Urshan =

Assyrian evangelist

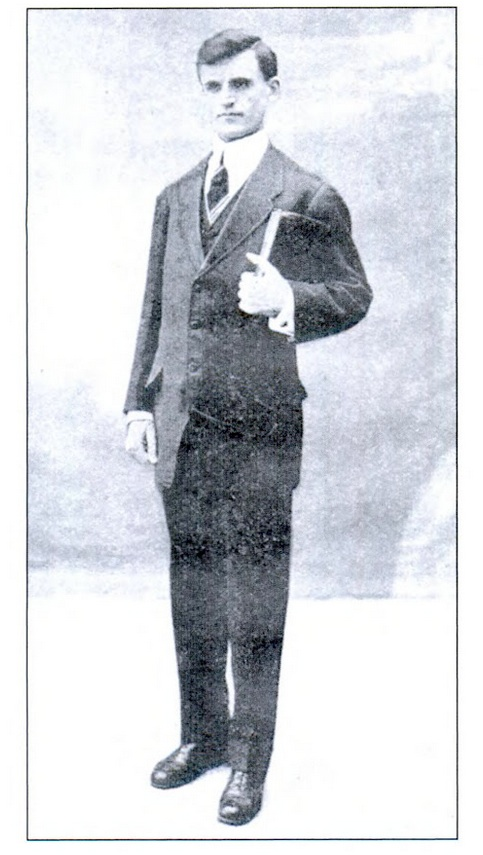
- Andrew David Urshan, photographed in 1911
- Born: Andreos Bar Dawid Urshan; 1884; Abajaloo, Persia
- Died: 1967 (aged 82-83); Bay City, Texas, United States
- Occupations: Evangelist, author

Andrew David Urshan (born Andreos Bar Dawid Urshan; May 17, 1884 – October 16, 1967) was a Persian-born Assyrian evangelist and author. Born near the city of Urmia, early in his life Urshan was influenced by the missionary activities of the Presbyterians. At the age of 18, he decided to travel to the United States, where he commenced his religious activities, embracing Pentecostalism and later founding the Persian Pentecostal Mission.

After spending about eleven years in the United States, in 1913 Urshan returned to his country of birth, only to find himself and his fellow Assyrians soon afterwards trapped by the Ottoman invasion of World War I. Urshan then made his way back to the United States, where he settled permanently.

Known as the Persian Evangelist, Urshan was the author of numerous religious books, and also the composer of hymns. He published The Witness of God (1917), a periodical that he continued for the rest of his life. Urshan published a serialized account of his own life story in the periodical, calling it The Life of Andrew bar David Urshan. Later, the installments appeared in the form of a book. He did not leave any writings in Assyrian Neo-Aramaic. His oldest son, Nathaniel, later served as the head of the United Pentecostal Church International for more than twenty years.

== Biography ==
Urshan was born to Shamasha Dawid Bar Urshan (a local deacon) and his wife Nassimo in the village of Abajaloo, near Urmia. He attended the Presbyterian College of Urmia, which had been established by American missionaries, where he "had a 'born again' experience in 1900".

In 1902, at the age of 18, Urshan traveled to the United States. He eventually reached New York City, having traveled through Tiflis (Tbilisi), Kiev, Warsaw, Berlin, and Hamburg. In 1906 he moved to Chicago, now using the anglicized name of Andrew David Urshan. There, he met a group of people who were, like himself, ethnically Assyrian, and with whom he intended to study the Bible alongside the nondenominational Moody Church. Soon after, in 1908, the group (including Urshan) embraced Pentecostalism at the North Avenue Mission led by William Howard Durham, after which Urshan founded the Persian Pentecostal Mission in Chicago. By 1910 he was reportedly traveling throughout the Midwest to conduct revival meetings.

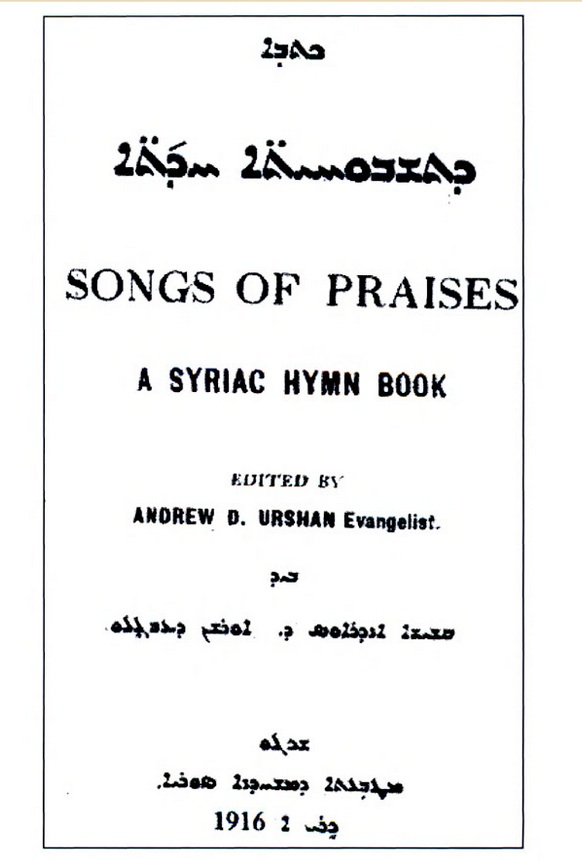
Title page of an Assyrian hymnbook, published by Andrew David Urshan

After spending eleven years in the US, Urshan returned to his native Persia in late 1913. During World War I, in early 1915, he was a witness to the terror brought upon Persia's Azerbaijan province by the Ottoman Turkish military incursions. The Ottoman invasion resulted in many of the Assyrians of the area being expelled from their homes. Having turned into a refugee, Andrew, his parents, and four brothers walked towards Georgia (then part of the Russian Empire), hoping they could "escape through Russia to the United States". The journey was an uneasy expedition; the family was forced to dodge "maurauding bands of Kurds and Turks" for many weeks. Andrew's brother Benjamin stated in an account that their parents, Shamasha and Nassimo, died during the trip and were buried with unmarked grave markers.

In Tiflis, Urshan preached and ministered amongst Persian immigrants, but, due to restrictions issued by the Russian government on foreign preachers, Urshan was forced to leave the city. He then proceeded towards Armavir, where he preached amongst refugees. During this second trip through the Russian Empire since his journey to the US in 1902, Andrew David was exposed to Russian Pentecostalism.

In 1916, now back in Chicago, Urshan recommenced his ministry, married, and "devoted his life to preaching nationwide". He was also reportedly active in "Pentecostal organizational activity".

== Urshan and the UPCI ==
Andrew David had four children. His oldest son, Nathaniel Andrew Urshan (1920–2005), was the head of the United Pentecostal Church International, "a leading Pentecostal denomination", for a period of over twenty years.

== See also ==
- Iranian Assyrians

== Sources ==
- Reed, David A. (2014). "Then and Now: The Many Faces of Global Oneness Pentecostalism". In Robeck, Cecil M. Jr.; Yong, Amos (eds.). The Cambridge Companion to Pentecostalism. Cambridge University Press. ISBN 978-1316060643.
- Schmidt, Stephen A. (2016). "URSHAN, ANDREŌS BAR DĀWĪD". In Yarshater, Ehsan (ed.). Encyclopædia Iranica (Online ed.). Encyclopædia Iranica Foundation.
