= Arabluy-e Yekan =

Arabluy-e Yekan عربلوی یکان
- Village
- Location within Iran
- Coordinates: 37°38′23″N 45°03′54″E
- Country: Iran
- Province: West Azerbaijan
- County: Urmia
- Bakhsh: Central
- Rural District: Nazluy-ye Jonubi

Population (2006)
  - Total: 154
- Time zone: UTC+3:30 (IRST)
  - Summer (DST): UTC+4:30 (IRDT)

Arabluy-e Yekan (Persian: عربلوی یکان, also Romanized as ‘Arablūy-e Yekān; also known as ‘Arablū and ‘Arablū-ye Yekān) is a village in Nazluy-ye Jonubi Rural District, in the Central District of Urmia County, West Azerbaijan Province, Iran. At the 2006 census, its population was 154, in 51 families.
