= Baranduzchay-ye Shomali Rural District =

Rural district in West Azerbaijan province, Iran

Baranduzchay-ye Shomali Rural District Persian: دهستان باراندوزچای شمالی
- Rural District
- Location within Iran
- Coordinates: 37°28′N 45°08′E
- Country: Iran
- Province: West Azerbaijan
- County: Urmia
- District: Central
- Established: 1987
- Capital: Qarah Aghaj

Population (2016)
  - Total: 8,486
- Time zone: UTC+3:30 (IRST)

Baranduzchay-ye Shomali Rural District (Persian: دهستان باراندوزچای شمالی) is in the Central District of Urmia County, West Azerbaijan province, Iran. Its capital is the village of Qarah Aghaj.

== Demographics ==
=== Population ===
At the time of the 2006 National Census, the rural district's population was 7,466 in 1,996 households. There were 7,529 inhabitants in 2,285 households at the following census of 2011. The 2016 census measured the population of the rural district as 8,486 in 2,660 households. The most populous of its 20 villages was Gug Tappeh, with 2,850 people.

=== Other villages in the rural district ===
- Borhanlu
- Dizaj-e Takyeh
- Faqih Beyglu
- Qotlu
- Sari Beygluy-e Moin
- Shams-e Hajjian
