= Sari Beygluy-e Moin =

Village in West Azerbaijan province, Iran

Sari Beygluy-e Moin Persian: ساري بيگلوي معين
- Village
- Location within Iran
- Coordinates: 37°28′54″N 45°10′53″E
- Country: Iran
- Province: West Azerbaijan
- County: Urmia
- District: Central
- Rural District: Baranduzchay-ye Shomali

Population (2016)
  - Total: 368
- Time zone: UTC+3:30 (IRST)

Sari Beygluy-e Moin (Persian: ساري بيگلوي معين) (Note: Also romanized as Sārī Beyglūy-e Moʿīn) is a village in Baranduzchay-ye Shomali Rural District of the Central District in Urmia County, West Azerbaijan province, Iran.

== Demographics ==
=== Population ===
At the time of the 2006 National Census, the village's population was 329 in 79 households. The following census in 2011 counted 348 people in 99 households. The 2016 census measured the population of the village as 368 people in 114 households.
