= Tala Tappeh Rural District =

Rural district in West Azerbaijan province, Iran

Tala Tappeh Rural District دهستان طلاتپه
- Rural District
- Location within Iran
- Coordinates: 37°44′N 45°13′E
- Country: Iran
- Province: West Azerbaijan
- County: Urmia
- District: Nazlu
- Established: 1987
- Capital: Tala Tappeh

Population (2016)
  - Total: 2,278
- Time zone: UTC+3:30 (IRST)

Tala Tappeh Rural District (Persian: دهستان طلاتپه) is in Nazlu District of Urmia County, West Azerbaijan province, Iran. Its capital is the village of Tala Tappeh.

== Demographics ==
=== Population ===
At the time of the 2006 National Census, the rural district's population was 3,004 in 925 households. There were 2,319 inhabitants in 745 households at the following census of 2011. The 2016 census measured the population of the rural district as 2,278 in 797 households. The most populous of its 19 villages was Tala Tappeh, with 547 people.

=== Other villages in the rural district ===
- Abajaluy-e Sofla
- Adeh-ye Bozorg
- Hesar-e Sopurghan
- Isa Luy-e Allah Verdi
- Khaneshan
- Khodaverdi Khan Kandi
- Mushabad
- Owsaluy-e Kazem
- Sopurghan
- Yengejeh
- Zirmanlu
