= Arabluy-e Darreh =

Village in West Azerbaijan province, Iran

Arabluy-e Darreh Persian: عربلوی دره
- Village
- Location within Iran
- Coordinates: 37°40′47″N 45°02′12″E
- Country: Iran
- Province: West Azerbaijan
- County: Urmia
- District: Central
- Rural District: Nazluy-e Jonubi

Population (2016)
  - Total: 346
- Time zone: UTC+3:30 (IRST)

Arabluy-e Darreh (Persian: عربلوی دره) (Note: Also romanized as ‘Arablūy-e Darreh; also known as ‘Arablū-ye Darreh) is a village in Nazluy-e Jonubi Rural District of the Central District in Urmia County, West Azerbaijan province, Iran.

== Demographics ==
=== Population ===
At the time of the 2006 National Census, the village's population was 448 in 129 households. The following census in 2011 counted 406 people in 124 households. The 2016 census measured the population of the village as 346 people in 111 households.
