= Gug Tappeh, Urmia =

Village in West Azerbaijan province, Iran

Gug Tappeh Persian: گوگ‌تپه
- Village
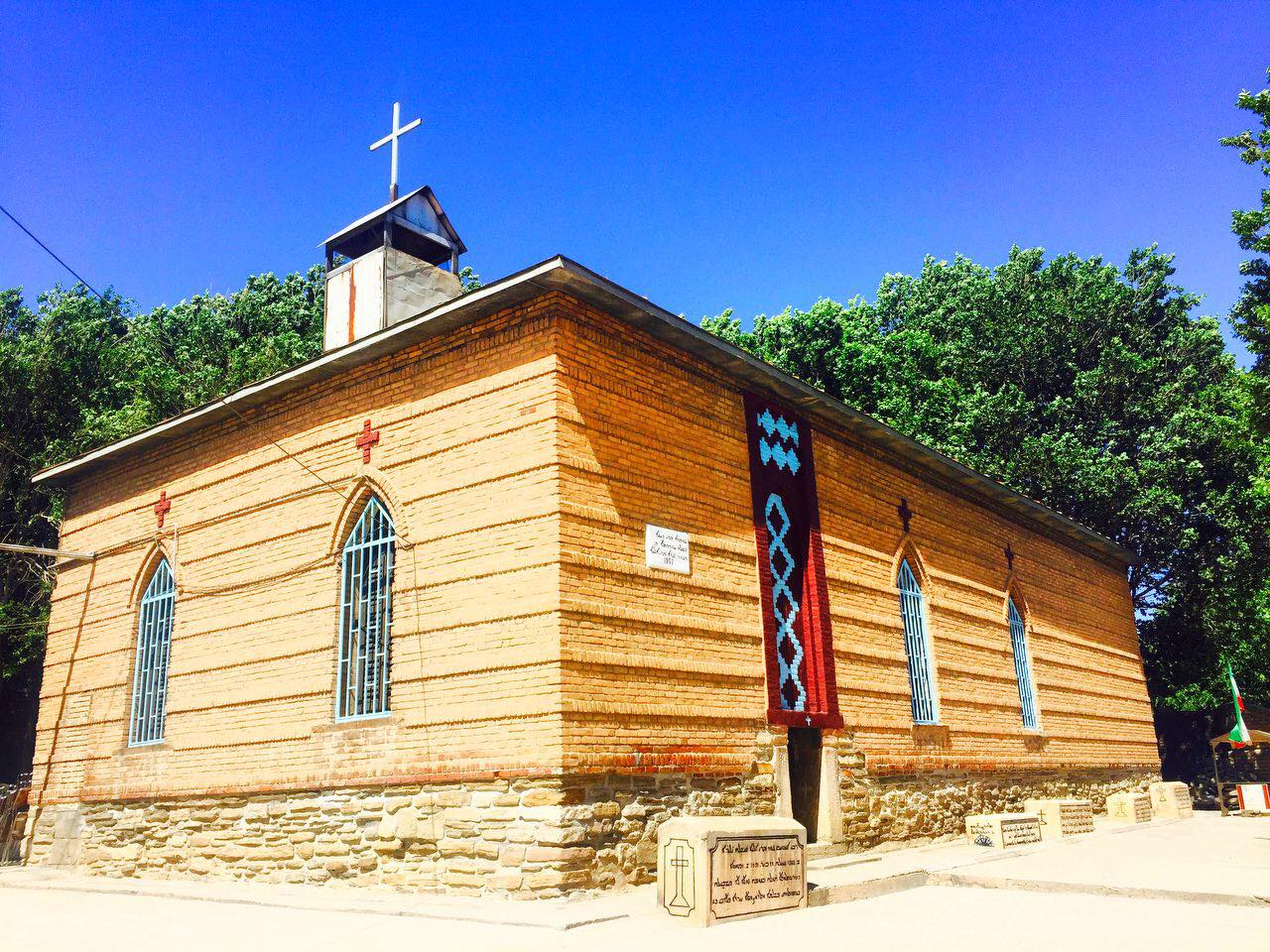
- Assyrian St. Zayya church in Gug Tappeh

- Location within Iran
- Coordinates: 37°31′02″N 45°08′40″E
- Country: Iran
- Province: West Azerbaijan
- County: Urmia
- District: Central
- Rural District: Baranduzchay-ye Shomali

Population (2016)
  - Total: 2,850
- Time zone: UTC+3:30 (IRST)

Gug Tappeh (Persian: گوگ‌تپه) (Note: Also romanized as Gūg Tappeh; also known as Goy Tappeh and Gūy Tappeh) is a village in Baranduzchay-ye Shomali Rural District of the Central District in Urmia County, West Azerbaijan province, Iran.

== Demographics ==
=== Population ===
At the time of the 2006 National Census, the village's population was 1,804 in 482 households. The following census in 2011 counted 2,439 people in 706 households. The 2016 census measured the population of the village as 2,850 people in 836 households. It was the most populous village in its rural district.

== Notable people ==
- Malek-Yonan family
  - George Malek-Yonan
  - Rosie Malek-Yonan
  - Terrence Malick

== Gallery ==
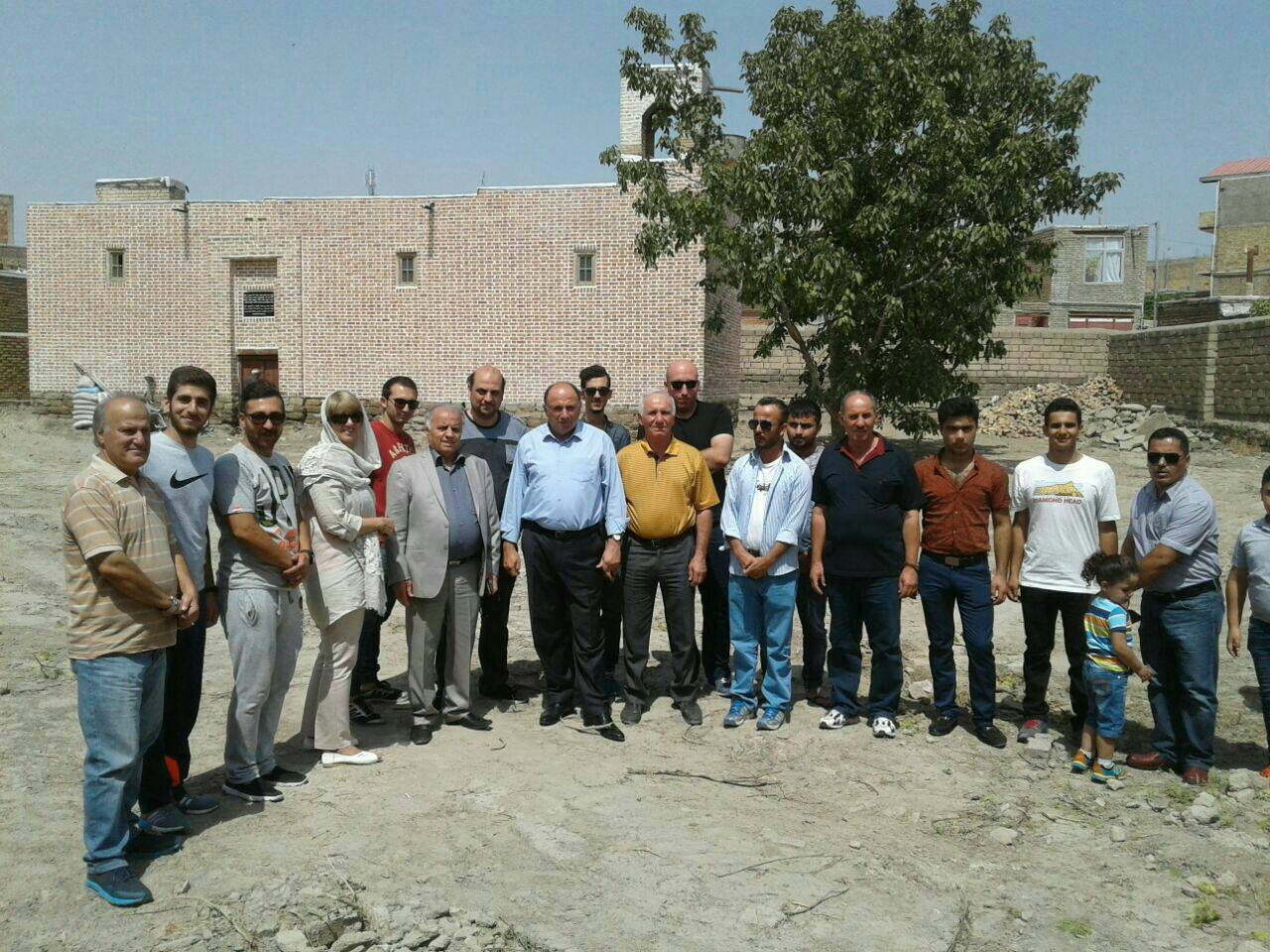
Assyrian Christian Family from Gug Tappeh.

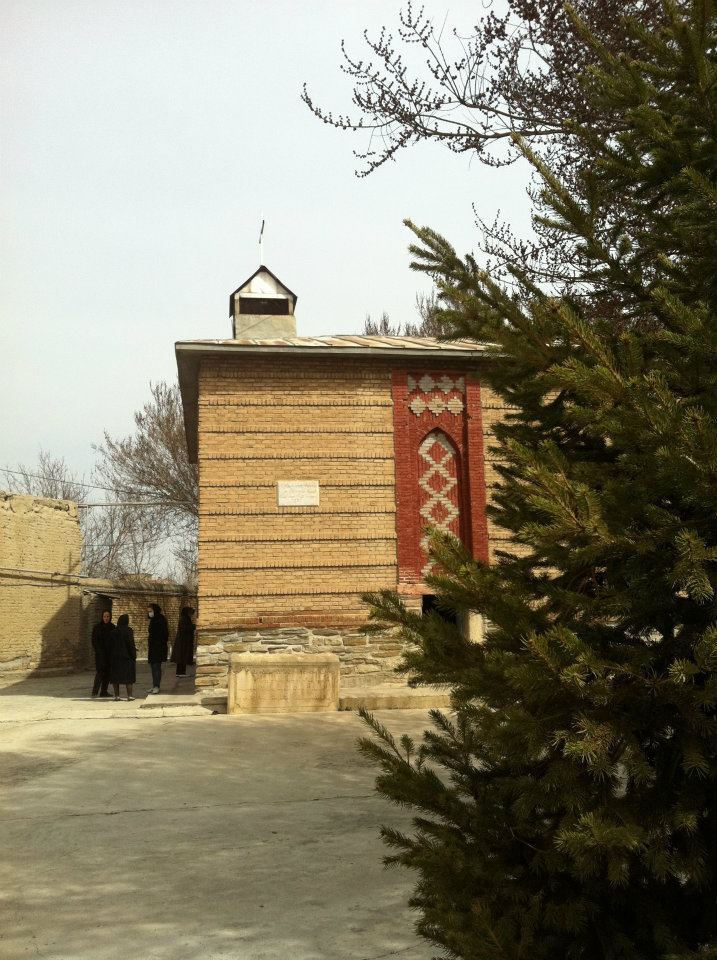
Assyrian church in Gug Tappeh.

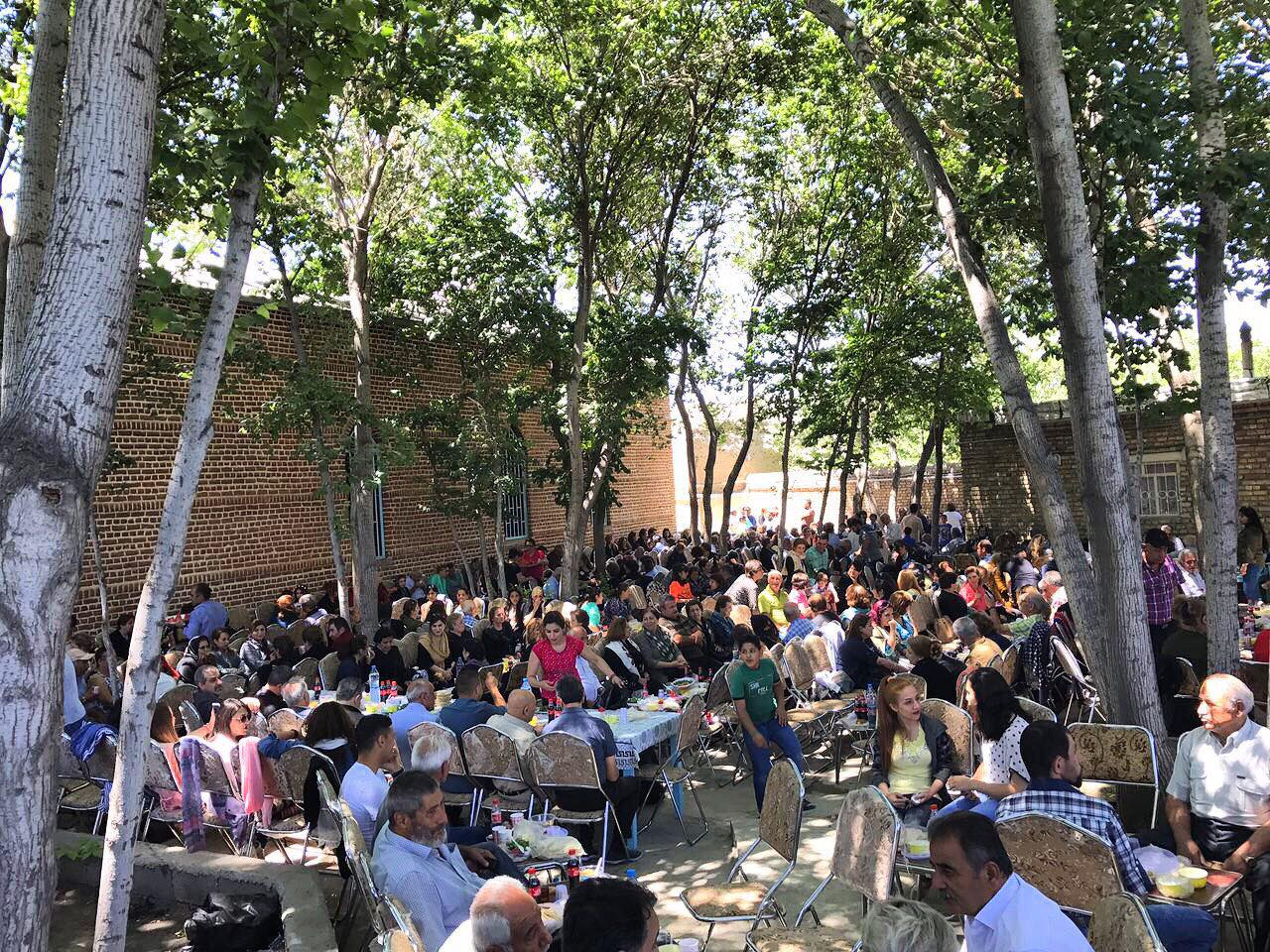
Assyrian Christian Festival in Gug Tappeh.

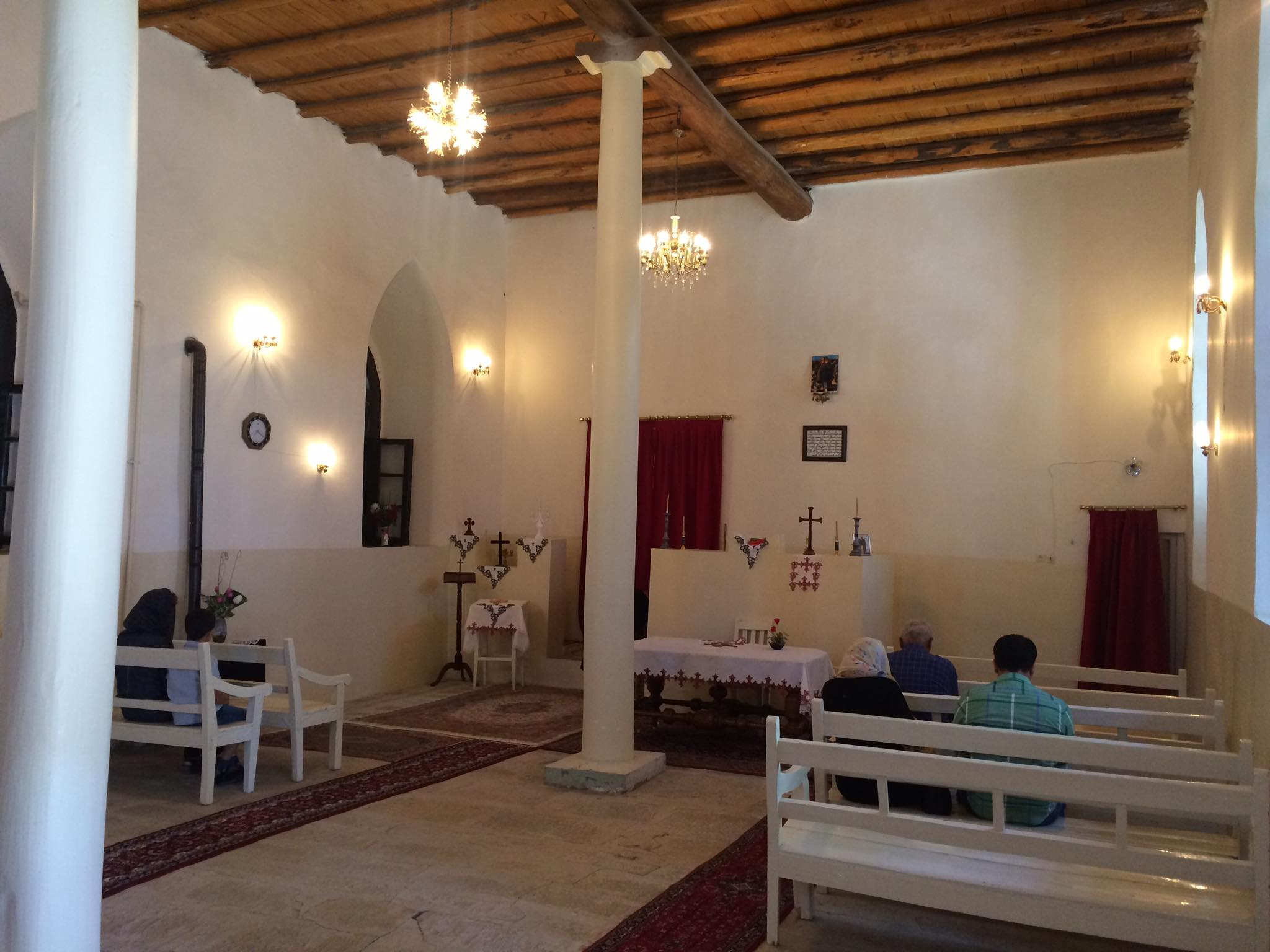
St. Zayya Church in Gug Tappeh.

== See also ==
- Geoy Tepe
- Assyrians in Iran
- List of Assyrian settlements
