= Arablu, East Azerbaijan =

Arablu عربلو
- Village
- Location within Iran
- Coordinates: 37°23′56″N 47°09′24″E
- Country: Iran
- Province: East Azerbaijan
- County: Hashtrud
- Bakhsh: Central
- Rural District: Aliabad

Population (2006)
  - Total: 39
- Time zone: UTC+3:30 (IRST)
  - Summer (DST): UTC+4:30 (IRDT)

Arablu (Persian: عربلو, also Romanized as ‘Arablū) is a village in Aliabad Rural District, in the Central District of Hashtrud County, East Azerbaijan Province, Iran. At the 2006 census, its population was 39, in 7 families.
