= Nazluchay Rural District =

Rural district in West Azerbaijan province, Iran

Nazluchay Rural District Persian: دهستان نازلوچائ
- Rural District
- Location within Iran
- Coordinates: 37°44′N 44°56′E
- Country: Iran
- Province: West Azerbaijan
- County: Urmia
- District: Nazlu
- Established: 1987
- Capital: Nazlu

Population (2016)
  - Total: 13,727
- Time zone: UTC+3:30 (IRST)

Nazluchay Rural District (Persian: دهستان نازلوچائ) is in Nazlu District of Urmia County, West Azerbaijan province, Iran. Its capital is the village of Nazlu.

== Demographics ==
=== Population ===
At the time of the 2006 National Census, the rural district's population was 10,624 in 2,104 households. There were 14,455 inhabitants in 2,690 households at the following census of 2011. The 2016 census measured the population of the rural district as 13,727 in 2,803 households. The most populous of its 34 villages was Qaralar-e Tasuji, with 2,844 people.

=== Other villages in the rural district ===
- Bahlulabad
- Department of Agriculture
- Esmail Aqa Qalehsi
- Kavsi
- Kharabeh-ye Senji
- Qaleh Sardar
- Senji
