= Nazluy-e Jonubi Rural District =

Rural district in West Azerbaijan province, Iran

Nazluy-e Jonubi Rural District Persian: دهستان نازلوی جنوبی
- Rural District
- Location within Iran
- Coordinates: 37°40′N 45°04′E
- Country: Iran
- Province: West Azerbaijan
- County: Urmia
- District: Central
- Established: 1987
- Capital: Asgarabad Tappeh

Population (2016)
  - Total: 7,510
- Time zone: UTC+3:30 (IRST)

Nazluy-e Jonubi Rural District (Persian: دهستان نازلوی جنوبی) is in the Central District of Urmia County, West Azerbaijan province, Iran. Its capital is the village of Asgarabad Tappeh.

== Demographics ==
=== Population ===
At the time of the 2006 National Census, the rural district's population was 8,350 in 2,357 households. There were 7,538 inhabitants in 2,279 households at the following census of 2011. The 2016 census measured the population of the rural district as 7,510 in 2,427 households. The most populous of its 36 villages was Chonqeraluy-e Yekan, with 1,191 people.

=== Other villages in the rural district ===
- Arabluy-e Darreh
- Chichakluy-e Hajji Aqa
- Dastjerd
- Faqibeyglu
- Gardabad
- Ghaffar Behi
- Sheykh Sar Mast
- Tazeh Kand-e Afshar
