= Baranduz Rural District =

Rural district in West Azerbaijan province, Iran

Baranduz Rural District Persian: دهستان باراندوز
- Rural District
- Location within Iran
- Coordinates: 37°26′N 45°03′E
- Country: Iran
- Province: West Azerbaijan
- County: Urmia
- District: Central
- Established: 1987
- Capital: Baran Duz

Population (2016)
  - Total: 12,008
- Time zone: UTC+3:30 (IRST)

Baranduz Rural District (Persian: دهستان باراندوز) is in the Central District of Urmia County, West Azerbaijan province, Iran. Its capital is the village of Baran Duz.

== Demographics ==
=== Population ===
At the time of the 2006 National Census, the rural district's population was 11,502 in 2,628 households. There were 11,088 inhabitants in 2,963 households at the following census of 2011. The 2016 census measured the population of the rural district as 12,008 in 3,292 households. The most populous of its 30 villages was Band, with 4,769 people.

=== Other villages in the rural district ===
- Bozveh
- Didan-e Sofla
- Gazanehkesh
- Janvislu
- Jorni
- Khataylu
- Saatluy Kuh
- Shamlakan
- Sheykhlar Mazari
- Varmazyar
