= Nazluy-e Shomali Rural District =

Rural district in West Azerbaijan province, Iran

Nazluy-e Shomali Rural District Persian: دهستان نازلوی شمالي
- Rural District
- Location within Iran
- Coordinates: 37°46′N 45°05′E
- Country: Iran
- Province: West Azerbaijan
- County: Urmia
- District: Nazlu
- Established: 1987
- Capital: Nushin

Population (2016)
  - Total: 15,316
- Time zone: UTC+3:30 (IRST)

Nazluy-e Shomali Rural District (Persian: دهستان نازلوی شمالي) is in Nazlu District of Urmia County, West Azerbaijan province, Iran. It is administered from the city of Nushin.

== Demographics ==
=== Population ===
At the time of the 2006 National Census, the rural district's population was 16,373 in 4,288 households. There were 15,538 inhabitants in 4,719 households at the following census of 2011. The 2016 census measured the population of the rural district as 15,316 in 4,772 households. The most populous of its 62 villages was Khaneqah Sorkh, with 1,789 people.

=== Other villages in the rural district ===
- Ali Beyglu
- Angeneh
- Asgarabad-e Kuh
- Bashlan Beshlu
- Chonqeraluy-e Pol
- Kachal Ali-ye Olya
- Par
- Rahimabad
- Saatluy-e Beyglar
