= Nazlu District =

District in West Azerbaijan province, Iran

Nazlu District Persian: بخش نازلو
- District
- Location within Iran
- Coordinates: 37°46′N 45°05′E
- Country: Iran
- Province: West Azerbaijan
- County: Urmia
- Established: 1990
- Capital: Nushin

Population (2016)
  - Total: 39,701
- Time zone: UTC+3:30 (IRST)

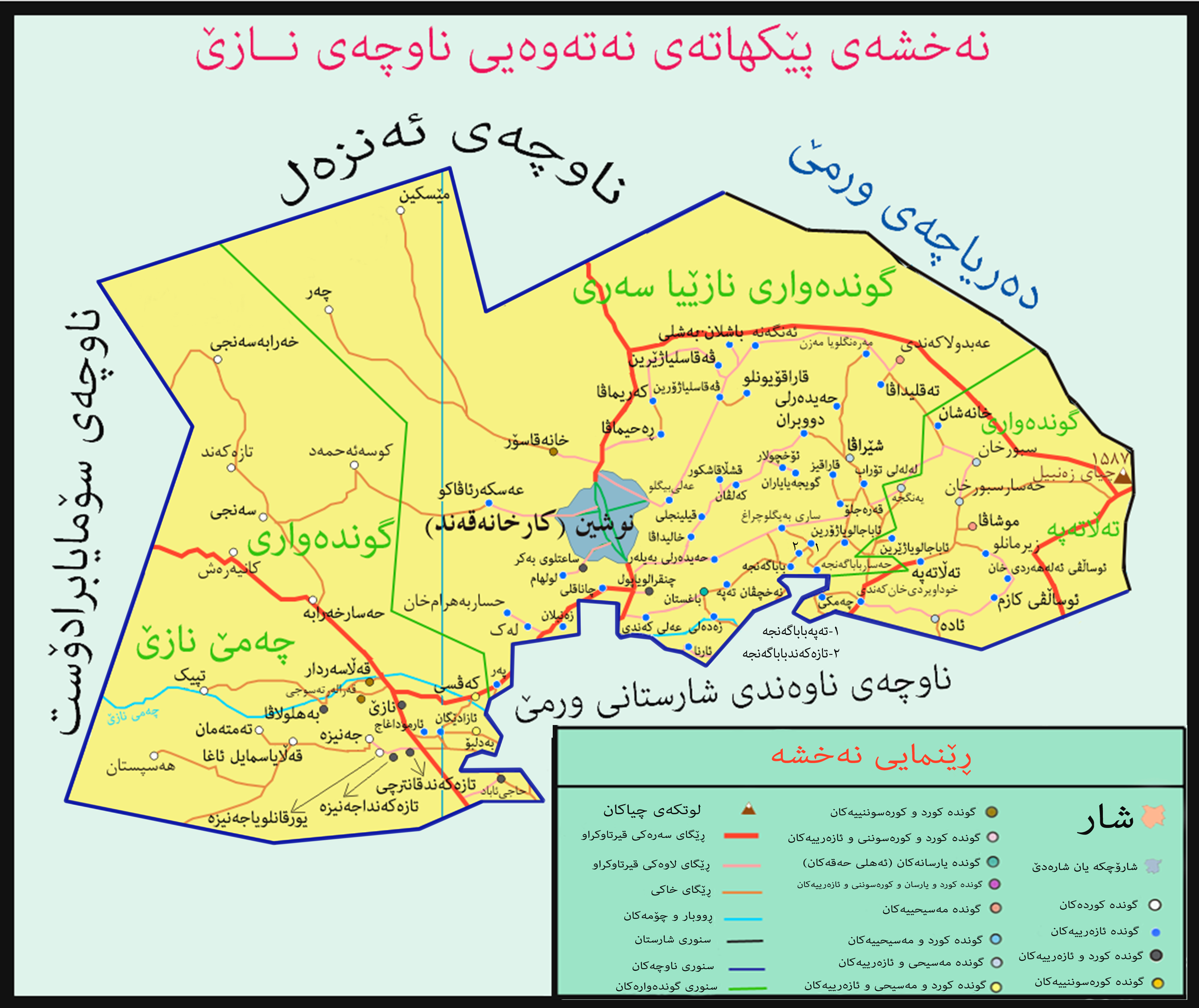
Map of the Nazlu district.

Nazlu District (Persian: بخش نازلو) is in Urmia County, West Azerbaijan province, Iran. Its capital is the city of Nushin.

== Demographics ==
=== Population ===
At the time of the 2006 National Census, the district's population was 36,732 in 8,943 households. The following census in 2011 counted 39,495 people in 10,115 households. The 2016 census measured the population of the district as 39,701 inhabitants in 10,683 households.

=== Administrative divisions ===
Nazlu District Population
Administrative Divisions	2006	2011	2016
Nazluchay RD	10,624	14,455	13,727
Nazluy-e Shomali RD	16,373	15,538	15,316
Tala Tappeh RD	3,004	2,319	2,278
Nushin (city)	6,731	7,183	8,380
Total	36,732	39,495	39,701
RD = Rural District
