= Urmia County =

County in West Azerbaijan province, Iran

Urmia County Persian: شهرستان ارومیه
- County
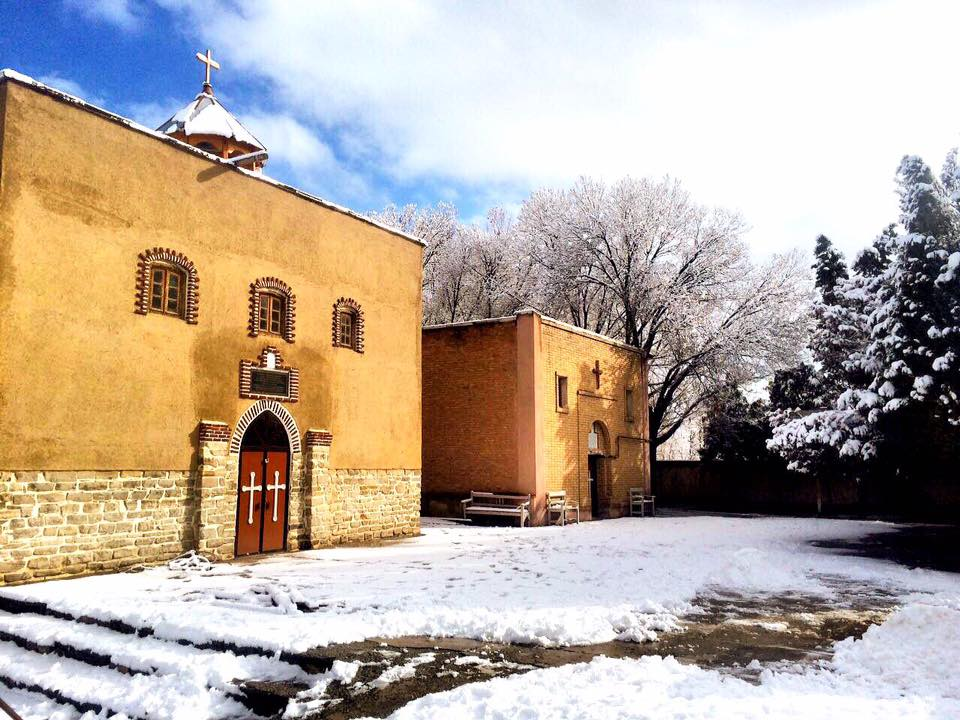
- Assyrian church of St. George (left) and Armenian church of St. Mary (right) in Reyhanabad

- Location of Urmia County in West Azerbaijan province (center, green)

- Location of West Azerbaijan province in Iran
- Coordinates: 37°39′N 44°58′E
- Country: Iran
- Province: West Azerbaijan
- Capital: Urmia
- Districts: Central, Anzal, Nazlu, Silvaneh, Sumay-ye Beradust

Population (2016)
  - Total: 1,040,565
- Time zone: UTC+3:30 (IRST)

Urmia County (Persian: شهرستان ارومیه) is in West Azerbaijan province, Iran. Its capital is the city of Urmia.

== Demographics ==
=== Ethnicity ===
The county is mainly populated by Azerbaijanis, Persians and Kurds.

=== Population ===
At the time of the 2006 National Census, the county's population was 856,914 in 215,342 households. The following census in 2011 counted 963,738 people in 272,439 households. The 2016 census measured the population of the county as 1,040,565 in 304,306 households.

=== Administrative divisions ===
Urmia County's population history and administrative structure over three consecutive censuses are shown in the following table.

Urmia County Population
Administrative Divisions	2006	2011	2016
Central District	702,376	806,861	879,709
Bakeshluchay RD	22,672	28,864	34,683
Baranduz RD	11,502	11,088	12,008
Baranduzchay-ye Jonubi RD	10,068	9,416	11,408
Baranduzchay-ye Shomali RD	7,466	7,529	8,486
Bash Qaleh RD	9,862	9,994	10,043
Dul RD	8,524	7,530	7,487
Nazluy-e Jonubi RD	8,350	7,538	7,510
Rowzeh Chay RD	36,556	47,510	41,843
Torkaman RD	10,069	9,893	10,017
Urmia (city)	577,307	667,499	736,224
Anzal District	25,252	25,729	25,599
Anzal-e Jonubi RD	19,482	20,605	20,560
Anzal-e Shomali RD	2,938	2,598	2,252
Qushchi (city)	2,832	2,526	2,787
Nazlu District	36,732	39,495	39,701
Nazluchay RD	10,624	14,455	13,727
Nazluy-e Shomali RD	16,373	15,538	15,316
Tala Tappeh RD	3,004	2,319	2,278
Nushin (city)	6,731	7,183	8,380
Silvaneh District	52,752	55,437	60,368
Dasht RD	8,647	9,012	10,199
Margavar RD	34,862	37,170	40,174
Targavar RD	7,893	7,765	8,381
Silvaneh (city)	1,350	1,490	1,614
Sumay-ye Beradust District	39,802	36,216	35,183
Beradust RD	13,766	11,593	11,361
Sumay-ye Jonubi RD	13,915	13,075	12,452
Sumay-ye Shomali RD	10,613	10,018	9,570
Serow (city)	1,508	1,530	1,800
Total	856,914	963,738	1,040,565
RD = Rural District

== See also ==
Media related to Urmia County at Wikimedia Commons
