= Karalar =

Karalar, also spelled Qaralar, is a Turkic word. It may refer to:

== Places ==
=== Armenia ===
- Karalar, Ararat

=== Azerbaijan ===
- Qaralar, Beylagan
- Qaralar, Imishli
- Qaralar, Qubadli
- Qaralar, Saatly
- Qaralar, Sabirabad
- Qaralar, Shamkir
- Qaralar, Tovuz
- Yuxarı Qaralar
- Qaracalar, also known as Karalar

=== Iran ===
- Qaralar-e Aqataqi, a village in West Azerbaijan Province
- Qaralar-e Hajjqasem, a village in West Azerbaijan Province
- Qaralar-e Kuh, a village in West Azerbaijan Province
- Qaralar-e Lotfollah Beyg, a village in West Azerbaijan Province
- Qaralar-e Tasuji, a village in West Azerbaijan Province

=== Turkey ===
- Karalar, Besni, a village in the district of Besni, Adıyaman Province
- Karalar, Çınar
- Karalar, Çivril
- Karalar, Gazipaşa, a village in the district of Gazipaşa, Antalya Province
- Karalar, Kalecik, a village in the district of Kalecik, Ankara Province
- Karalar, Kazan, a village and neighborhood in the district of Kazan, Ankara Province
- Karalarbahşiş, a village in the district of Anamur, Mersin Province

== See also ==
- Karalılar (disambiguation)
