= Qarahlar =

Qarahlar or Qarehlar or Qarah Lar (Persian: قره لر) may refer to various places in Iran:

- Qarahlar, Ardabil
- Qarehlar, East Azerbaijan
- Shahrak-e Qarah Lar, North Khorasan Province
- Qarehlar, West Azerbaijan
- Qarahlar-e Aqa Taqi, West Azerbaijan Province
- Qarahlar-e Gurkhaneh, West Azerbaijan Province
- Qarahlar-e Hajj Taqi, West Azerbaijan Province
