= Laman (disambiguation) =

Laman or Lamane may refer to:

== People ==
- Karl Edvard Laman, Swedish missionary and ethnographer
- Laman and Lemuel, figures in the Book of Mormon
- Lamane Jegan Joof, the medieval Serer founder of Tukar

== Title ==
- Lamane (or Laman), a Seereer title of nobility
- States headed by Serer Lamanes

== Places ==
- Laman, Azerbaijan (disambiguation)
  - Laman, Khachmaz, Azerbaijan
  - Laman, Lerik, Azerbaijan
