= Məmmədli =

Məmmədli or Magamedly or Magomedli or Magomedly or Mamedi may refer to:

- Məmmədli, Absheron, Azerbaijan
- Məmmədli, Barda, Azerbaijan
- Məmmədli, Imishli, Azerbaijan
- Məmmədli, Kurdamir, Azerbaijan
- Lənbəran, Azerbaijan

== See also ==
- Mamedli (disambiguation)
