= Xoşçobanlı =

Xoşçobanlı may refer to:

- Xoşçobanlı, Imishli, Azerbaijan
- Xoşçobanlı, Masally, Azerbaijan

== See also ==
- Khoshchobanly (disambiguation)
