= Sarxanlı (disambiguation) =

Sarxanlı or Sarıxanlı or Sərxanlı may refer to:

- Sarxanlı, Azerbaijan
- Sərxanlı, Azerbaijan
- Sarıxanlı, Azerbaijan
