= Ağaməmmədli =

Ağaməmmədli or Agamamedli or Agmamedly may refer to:

- Ağaməmmədli, Imishli, Azerbaijan
- Agamamedli, Saatly, Azerbaijan
- Ağaməmmədli, Tovuz, Azerbaijan
