= Bəcirəvan =

Bəcirəvan or Badzhiravan or Badzhirovan or Bodzherevan may refer to:

- Bəcirəvan, Barda, Azerbaijan
- Bəcirəvan, Imishli, Azerbaijan
- Bəcirəvan, Jalilabad, Azerbaijan
