= Qaraqaşlı =

Qaraqaşlı may refer to:

- Qaraqaşlı, Agsu, Azerbaijan
- Qaraqaşlı, Imishli, Azerbaijan
- Qaraqaşlı, Khachmaz, Azerbaijan
- Qaraqaşlı, Neftchala, Azerbaijan
- Qaraqaşlı, Sabirabad, Azerbaijan
- Karakashly, Azerbaijan
