= Suvorovka =

Suvorovka may refer to:

- Suvorovka, Altai Krai, Russia
- The former name of Hacırüstəmli, Azerbaijan
