= Mursal =

Mursal may refer to:

- Mursal (hadith)
- Mursal Isa (born 1981), Somalia-born Swedish politician
- Murğuzallı, Azerbaijan
- Mürsəl, Azerbaijan
