= Mürsəlli =

Mürsəlli or Myursali or Myursalli or Myursally may refer to:

- Mürsəlli, Imishli, Azerbaijan
- Mürsəlli, Sabirabad, Azerbaijan
- Mursallı, Aydın, Turkey
