= Mursal, Azerbaijan =

Mursal, Azerbaijan may refer to:

- Murğuzallı
- Mürsəl
