= Muradlı =

Muradlı may refer to:

- Mahammad Muradli, 2015 World Youth Chess Champion from Azerbaijan
- Muradlı, Agsu, a village and municipality in the Agsu Rayon of Azerbaijan
- Moradlu District, a district in Meshgin Shahr County, Ardabil Province, Iran
- Haçıalmuradlı, a village and municipality in the Imishli Rayon of Azerbaijan
