= Karamat Boyukchol =

Azerbaijani writer (born 1987)

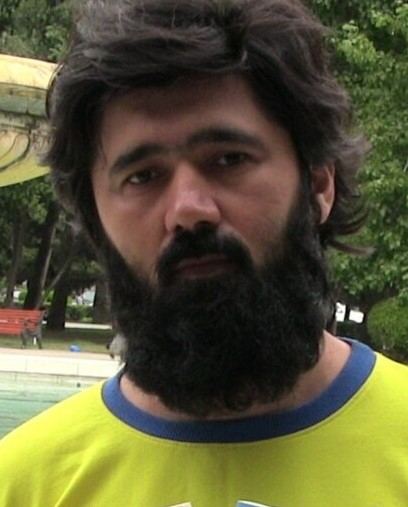
- Boyukchol in 2022
- Born: Kəramət Qəşəm oğlu Nəcəfov; 17 October 1987 (age 38); Aligulular, Imishli District, Azerbaijan SSR, USSR
- Citizenship: Azerbaijan
- Education: Baku State University
- Children: 2
- Writing career
- Language: Azerbaijani

Karamat Boyukchol (Azerbaijani: Kəramət Böyükçöl, born Kəramət Qəşəm oğlu Nəcəfov; 17 October 1987) Azerbaijani opinion writer and writer.

== Early life ==
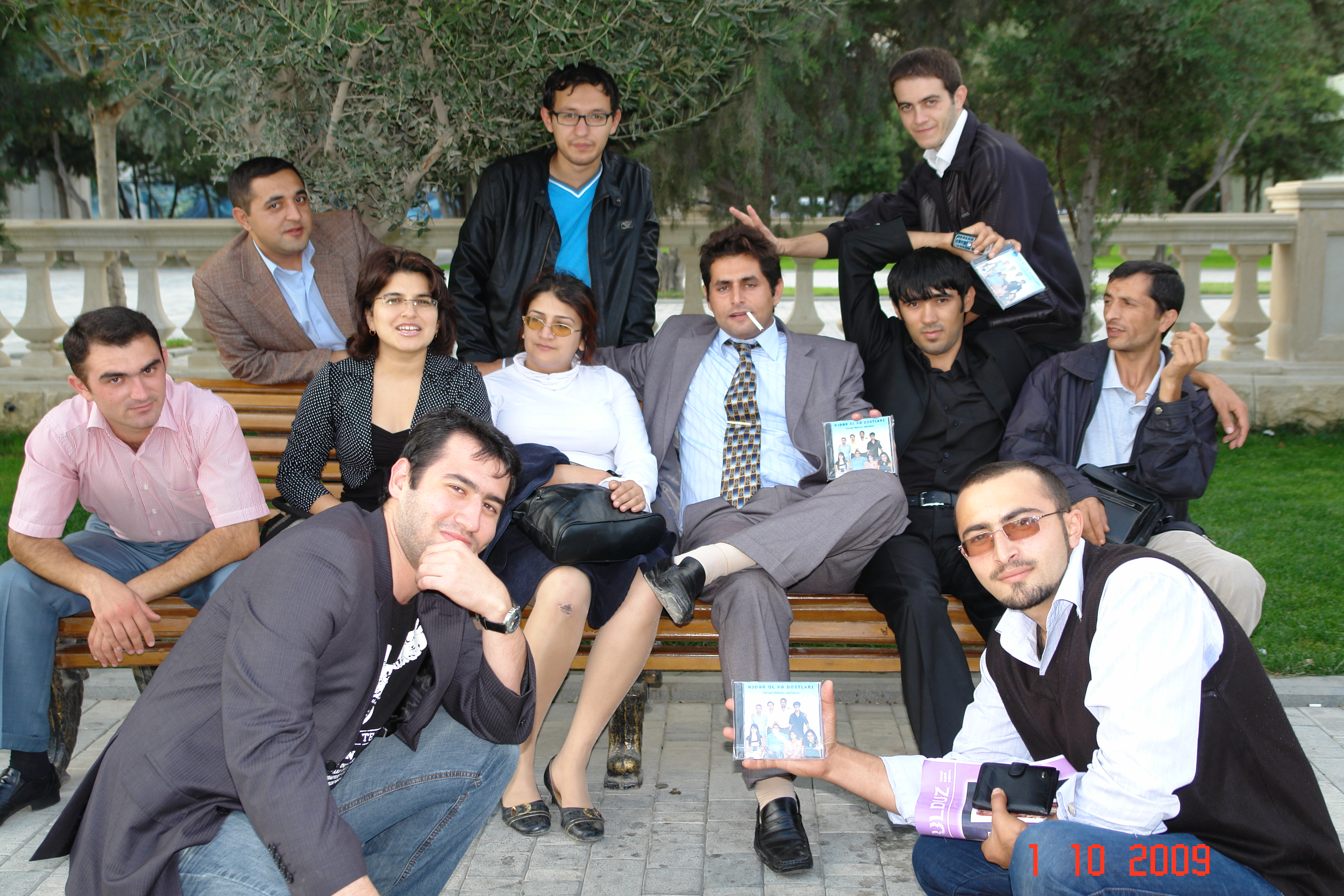
Karamat Boyukchol in youth years, 2009 (seated second from right).

Karamat Boyukchol was born on 17 October 1987 in the Aligulular village of the Imishli District. His father, Gasham Najafzadeh, named him after his fellow student and poet Karamat Şhukurov. He graduated from Secondary School No. 51 in the Sabail District. From 2007 to 2011, he studied at the Faculty of Philology of Baku State University.
