= Chakhmak =

Chakhmak may refer to:

- Chakhmakh
- Chakhmakh-Bina
- Chakhmaq Chukhur
- Chakhmaq Bolagh-e Sofla
- Chakmak

== Seo also ==
- Chakhmakhly (disambiguation)
