= Gyulmirza =

- Location within Azerbaijan
- Coordinates: 39°46′N 48°13′E
- Country: Azerbaijan
- Rayon: Imishli
- Time zone: UTC+4 (AZT)
  - Summer (DST): UTC+5 (AZT)

Gyulmirza (also, Gyul’mirza) is a village in the Imishli Rayon of Azerbaijan. İt is located in the south of Xəlfəli village. population is 748 people.
