= Chakhmakhly (disambiguation) =

Chakhmakhly is a town in Armenia.

Chakhmakhly may also refer to:

- Çaxmaqlı, a town in Azerbaijan

== Seo also ==
- Chakhmak (disambiguation)
