= Verkhniy Karalar =

Verkhniy Karalar may refer to:

- Qaralar, Imishli, Azerbaijan
- Yuxarı Qaralar, Azerbaijan
