= Kyurabazly =

- Location within Azerbaijan
- Coordinates: 39°46′59″N 48°12′16″E
- Country: Azerbaijan
- Rayon: Imishli
- Time zone: UTC+4 (AZT)
  - Summer (DST): UTC+5 (AZT)

Kyurabazly is a village in the Imishli Rayon of Azerbaijan. İt is located in the southwest of Xəlfəli village. Population is 1056 people.
