= Khoshchobanly =

Khoshchobanly or Khoshchobanly or Khash-Chabanly may refer to:

- Khoshchobanly, Salyan, Azerbaijan
- Xoşçobanlı, Imishli, Azerbaijan
- Xoşçobanlı, Masally, Azerbaijan
