= Qaragüvəndli =

- Municipality
- Location within Azerbaijan
- Coordinates: 39°43′20″N 47°54′28″E
- Country: Azerbaijan
- Rayon: Imishli

Population
  - Total: 1,284
- Time zone: UTC+4 (AZT)
  - Summer (DST): UTC+5 (AZT)

Qaragüvəndli (also, Qaragüvəndikli, Qaraqüvəndli, and Karakyuvendikly) is a village and municipality in the Imishli Rayon of Azerbaijan. It has a population of 1,284.

This village was created in 1991 when villages Aşağı Qaragüvəndli and Yuxarı Qaragüvəndli were merged.

== See also ==
- Aşağı Qaragüvəndli (Lower Qaragüvəndli)
- Yuxarı Qaragüvəndli (Upper Qaragüvəndli)
