= Karalılar =

Karalılar, also spelled Karalylar or Qaralılar, is a Turkic word. It may refer to:

- Qaralılar, Beylagan, Beylagan Rayon, Azerbaijan
- Qaralar, Shamkir, Shamkir Rayon, Azerbaijan, also called Karalylar

== See also ==
- Karalar (disambiguation)
