= Kizilkend =

Kizilkend or Kzylkend may refer to:

- Kyzylkend, Armenia
- Gizilkend, Azerbaijan
