= Karagashli =

Karagashli may refer to:

- Karagash, a Turkic people
- Qaraqaşlı (disambiguation), places in Azerbaijan
