= Khanlykh-Dzhevat =

- Location within Azerbaijan
- Coordinates: 39°52′N 48°07′E
- Country: Azerbaijan
- Rayon: Imishli
- Time zone: UTC+4 (AZT)
  - Summer (DST): UTC+5 (AZT)

Khanlykh-Dzhevat is a village in the Imishli Rayon of Azerbaijan.
