= Sayyad Aran =

Azerbaijani writer (born 1952)

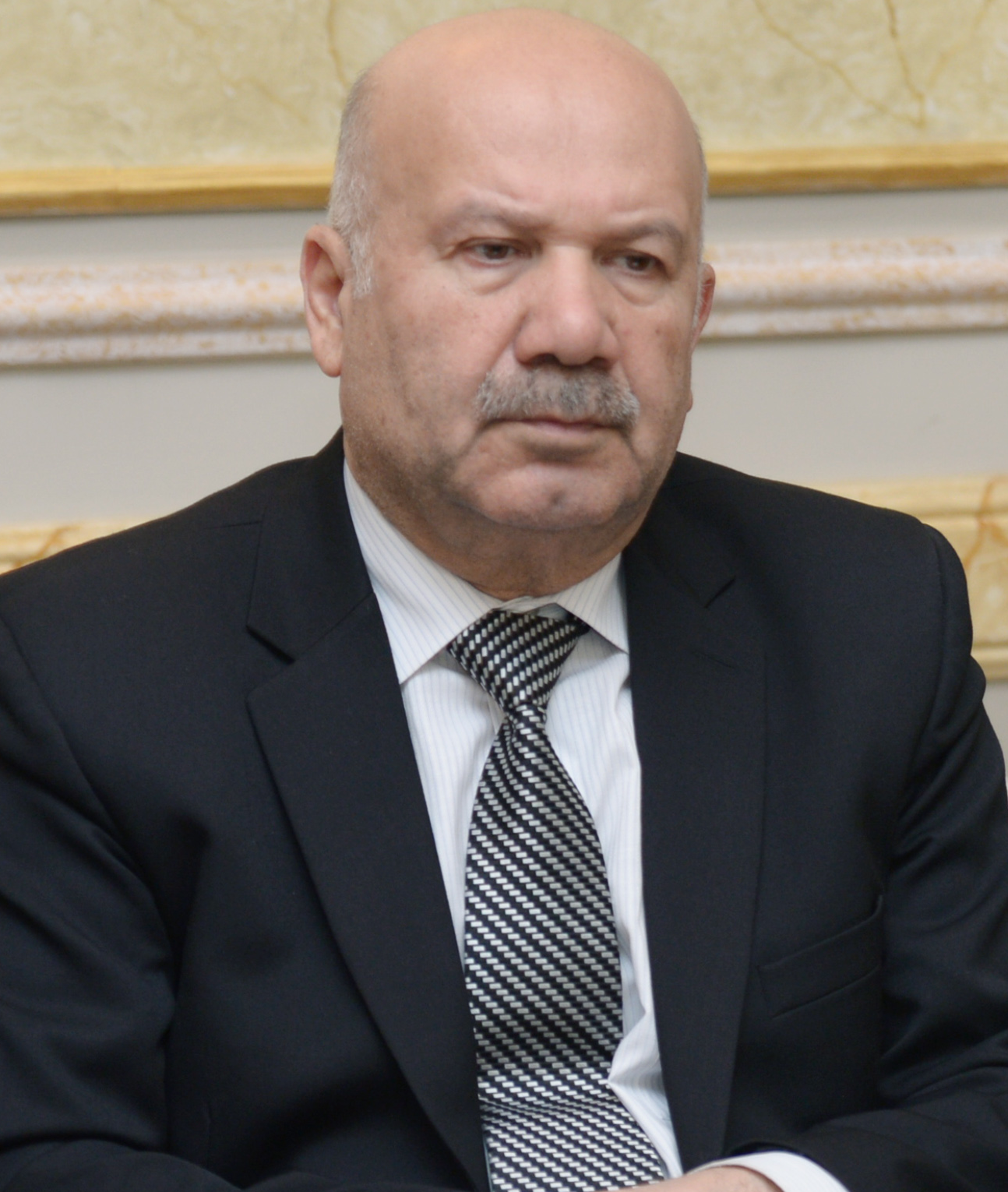

First Deputy Chairman of the State Committee on Religious Associations of the Republic of Azerbaijan
- Incumbent
- Assumed office 16 November 2012

Personal details
- Born: Sayyad Adil oghlu Salahly; 15 January 1952 (age 74) Garadonlu, Imishli, Azerbaijan SSR, Soviet Union (now Azerbaijan)
- Party: New Azerbaijan Party
- Children: three sons

Sayyad Aran or Sayyad Salahly (Azerbaijani: Səyyad Adil oğlu Salahlı; 15 January 1952 in Garadonlu, Imishli District, Azerbaijan SSR, USSR) (full name: Sayyad Adil oglu Salahli; January 15, 1952, Imishli) is an Azerbaijani social-political figure, candidate of philological sciences (2005), one of the founders of the New Azerbaijan Party, writer-publicist, ambassador extraordinary and plenipotentiary of the Republic of Azerbaijan of the first class. He has been a member of the National Assembly (Azerbaijan), deputy of the 1st and 2nd convocation of the Milli Majlis of the Republic of Azerbaijan in 1995–2005, first deputy chairman of the State Committee on Affairs with Religious Associations of the Republic of Azerbaijan (since November 16, 2012). Honored journalist of the Republic of Azerbaijan.

== Biography ==
Sayyad Adil oglu Salahli was born in a teacher's family in Garadonlu village of Imishli on 15 January 1952. The family consisted of 10 children, where he was the first.

== Education ==
From 1958 to 1968, he studied at a secondary school in Imishli.

In 1958–1968, he studied at secondary school No. 1 in Imishli city.

In 1968, he entered the philology faculty of the Azerbaijan State Pedagogical Institute named after V.I. Lenin and graduated from that faculty in 1972.

He received his second higher education at Baku State University and graduated from the Faculty of Law of BSU in 2001.

In 2005, at the Nizami Institute of Literature of the Azerbaijan National Academy of Sciences, he defended his dissertation in "Azerbaijani literature" (specialization code: 10.01.01) on the topic "Psychologism in Azerbaijani prose of the 1960s-1980s (based on the works of Mevlud Suleymanli)"[8] and became candidate of philological sciences.

== Employment ==
In 1972–1973, after graduating from high school, he worked as a language and literature teacher in the village secondary school of Azizbeyov (now Ashagi Garalar), Imishli district, where he was assigned.

From 1973 to 1974, he served as a captain at the military unit number 69626 of the Soviet Army located in Nyjchivand, Qivag. From 1974 until the end of December 1989, he worked at a secondary school in Imishli.

From 1974 to the end of December 1989, he worked as a language-literature teacher, a deputy for the primary department, then the secretary of the first party organization, and a deputy director for extracurricular and out of school activities in Imishli secondary school No. 1

In 1990, he was appointed chief of the Department of Public Education in Imishli, but he was dismissed from the post after no more than one year. On 2 January 1991, he relocated from Imishli to Baku where he initially worked in "Elm" newspaper where he became head of department. From 1992 to 1995, he became the first deputy editor of the "Səs" (Voice) newspaper.

In 2001–2006, he worked as the dean of the Faculty of Journalism of Azerbaijan International University.

In 2011–2012, he worked as a leading consultant of the State registry sector of Territorial units and municipalities of the service of the Chief of Staff of the Milli Majlis of the Republic of Azerbaijan

== Socio-political activity ==
One of the founders of the New Azerbaijan Party. Thus, in 1992, he was one of the initiators and founders of the constituent conference of YAP. He was a representative of the 1st, 2nd, and 3rd congresses of YAP; Since November 21, 1992, he is one of the first 50 members of the YAP Political Council elected at the founding conference of YAP. In 1995–1999, he was the head of the YAP ideology department, and then the head of the YAP Inter-Party Relations department. In October 2006, when he was sent to Istanbul for diplomatic service, according to the Law of the Republic of Azerbaijan "On Diplomatic Service", he left the YAP membership and the YAP Political Council. In May 2012, he was re-admitted to the ranks of YAP He has been described as a close associate of Azerbaijan ruler Heydar Aliyev.

== In Parliament ==
In 1995, Seyyad Aran was elected as a deputy from Zardab-Imishli-Ujar electoral district No. 67, and in 2000 from Zardab-Imishli electoral district No. 67 to the Milli Majlis of the Republic of Azerbaijan based on the majority election system. He was closely involved in the preparation of a number of legislative acts. For example, at the meeting of the Milli Majlis of the Republic of Azerbaijan on October 20, 2009, deputy Elmira Akhundova said the following about Sayyad Aran during the discussion of the next draft law on mass media:

"... I think that the most progressive and most complete law adopted in the Milli Majlis in this field was prepared by MP Seyyad Aran, who was a professional journalist during the time of our national leader. When I teach journalism, I use this law as an example in the entire post-Soviet space..."

Shorthand record of the meeting of the Milli Majlis of the Republic of Azerbaijan on October 20, 2009.

=== 1st Convocation ===
Sayyad Aran represented the New Azerbaijan Party in the 1st convocation elections to the Milli Majlis of the Republic of Azerbaijan, and took part in this election under the surname Salahov. He participated in the election based on the majority electoral system and became a candidate for deputy from Zardab-Imishli-Ujar electoral district number 67 and was elected as a deputy in the elections held on November 12, 1995. From March 7, 1997, he worked as part of the working group on Azerbaijan-China inter-parliamentary relations during the 1st convocation.

=== 2nd Convocation ===
Sayyad Aran also represented the New Azerbaijan Party in the second convocation elections to the Milli Majlis of the Republic of Azerbaijan, but this time, unlike the previous election, he changed his last name and took part in the election with the surname Salahli. He again participated in the election based on the majority electoral system and was a candidate for deputy from the reorganized Zardab-Imishli electoral district number 67 and was elected as a deputy in the elections held on November 5, 2000 . From December 5, 2000, during the II convocation period, he was the head of the working group on Azerbaijan-Malaysia inter-parliamentary relations, and worked as part of the working group on Azerbaijan-China inter-parliamentary relations.

Since 2001, he worked as the Dean of the Journalism Faculty of Azerbaijan University. In 2001, he received a second degree in higher education from Baku State University Law School. In 2005, he defended his dissertation on the topic of "Psychology in the Azerbaijani prose in 1960–1980 years (on the work of Movlud Suleymanli)" in Azerbaijani literature (specialty code: 10.01.01) at the Institute of Literature.

== Diplomatic activity ==
On October 9, 2006, he was given the diplomatic rank of first-class extraordinary and plenipotentiary ambassador of the Republic of Azerbaijan. From October 9, 2006 to May 3, 2010 Consul General of the Republic of Azerbaijan in Istanbul, Turkey, and from December 14, 2006 to May 3, 2010 he worked as a permanent representative of the Republic of Azerbaijan at the Black Sea Economic Cooperation Organization.

In June 2009, he was awarded the "Diplomat of the Year" award of "First Business" magazine published in Turkey in the nomination "Diplomat of the Year" for his services in deepening friendship and fraternal relations between the Republic of Azerbaijan and Turkey during diplomatic activity.

In 2019, by the Decree of the Ministry of Foreign Affairs of the Republic of Azerbaijan, he was awarded the jubilee medal "100th anniversary of diplomatic service bodies of the Republic of Azerbaijan (1919-2019)".

From 2011 to 2012, he worked as a leading adviser of the State Register of Territorial Units and Municipalities of the Service of the Head of Staff in the National Assembly of Azerbaijan (Milli Mejlis).

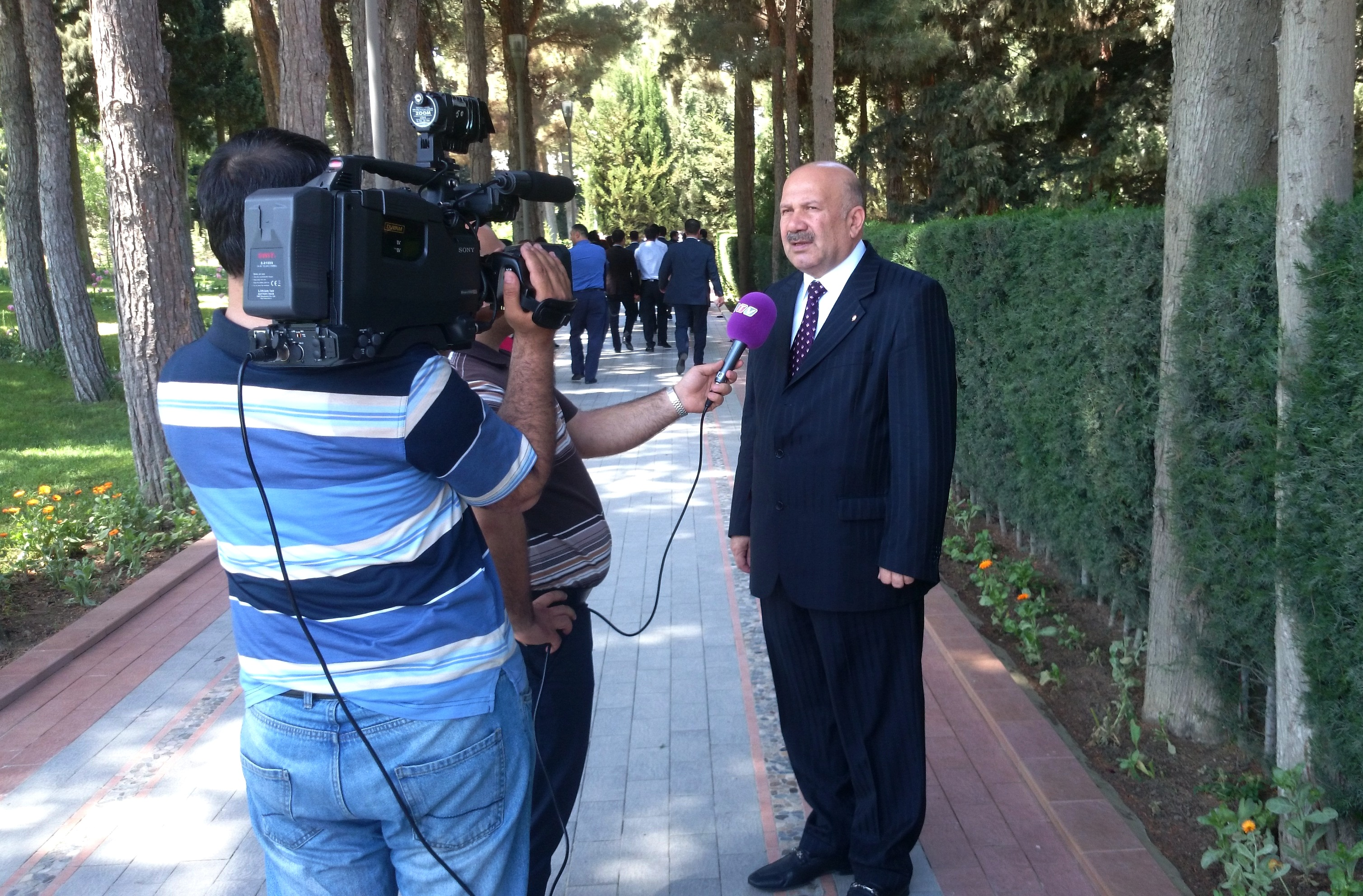
Interviewing Public TV

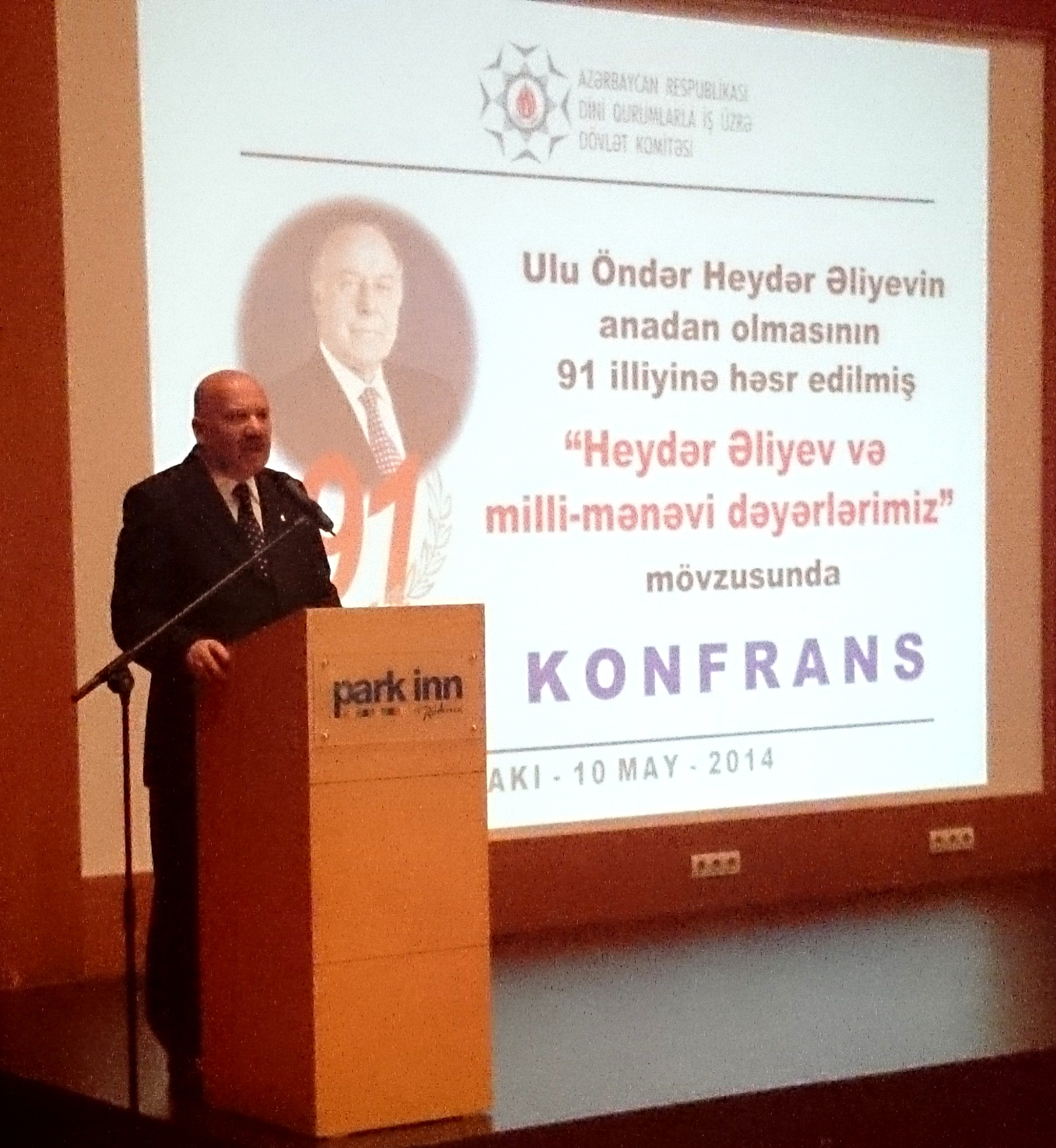
Speaking at the conference dedicated to the 91st anniversary of Heydar Aliyev's birth.

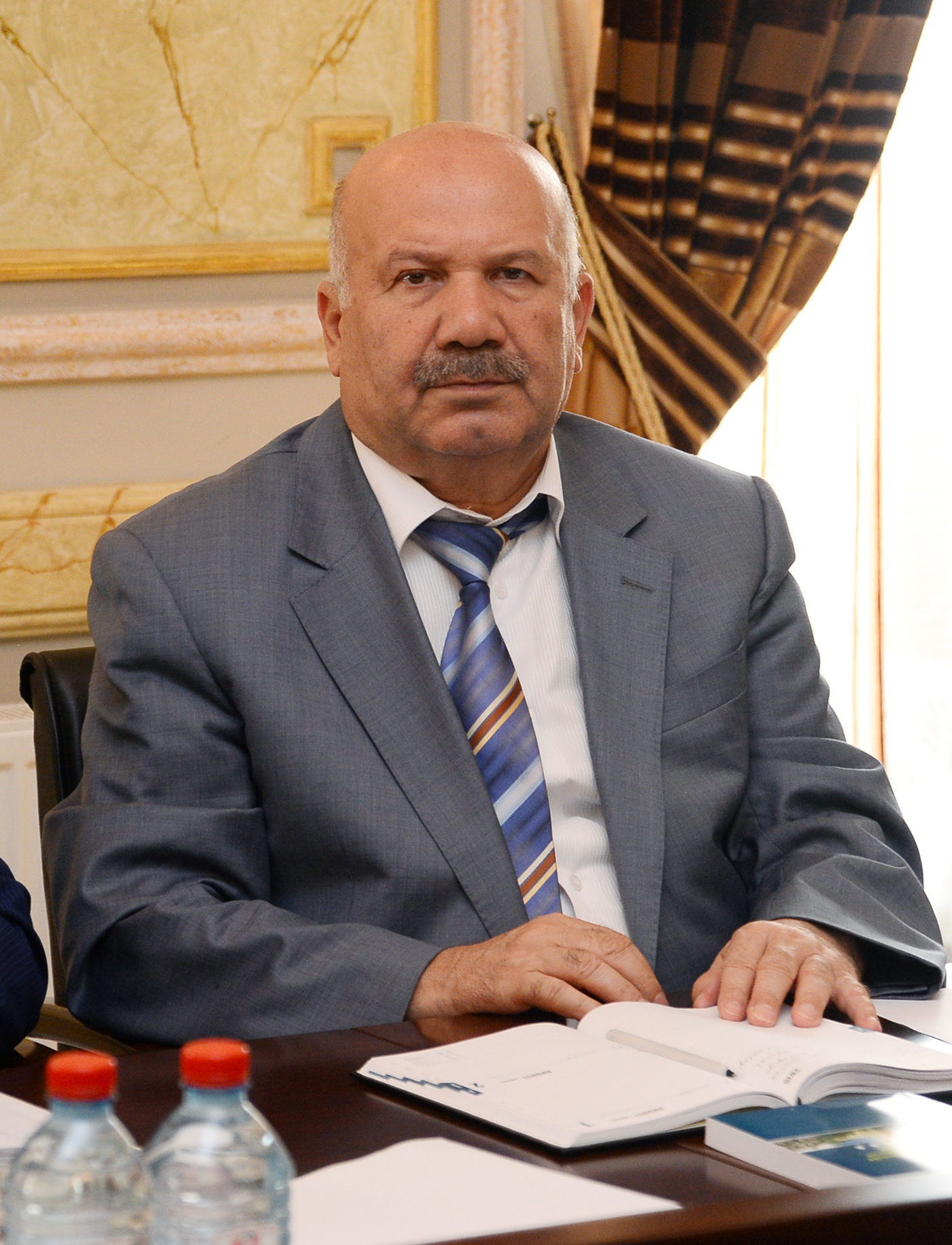
Sayyad Salahlı (13 December 2012)

He was appointed the first deputy chairman of the State Committee on Religious Associations on 16 November 2012 by the President of the Republic of Azerbaijan.

== The State Committee ==
On November 16, 2012, by the Decree of the President of the Republic of Azerbaijan, he was appointed as the first deputy chairman of the State Committee on Affairs with Religious Associations of the Republic of Azerbaijan. Sayyad Aran is the first deputy chairman of the State Committee on Affairs with Religious Associations of the Republic of Azerbaijan. Prior to this appointment, there was no position of the first deputy chairman in the State Committee, and with the decree signed by the President of the Republic of Azerbaijan on the same day as the appointment, changes were made in the "Statute of the State Committee on Affairs with Religious Associations of the Republic of Azerbaijan", and a new staff unit was opened in the structure of the State Committee.

Sayyad Aran served as acting chairman of the State Committee on Affairs with Religious Associations of the Republic of Azerbaijan twice (May 2-July 21, 2014 and February 16-April 8, 2024).

At present, the local representations of the State Committee on Affairs with Religious Associations - regional departments are under the supervision of the first deputy chairman of the State Committee - Sayyad Aran. Since January 2013, he has been included in the editorial board of the "Society and Religion" newspaper established by the State Committee and the 187th issue of the newspaper dated January 10–16, 2013 was first published under his editorship. In that issue of the newspaper, Sayyad Aran also appeared with an author's article. To this day, he is the editor-in-chief of that newspaper.

He was on Hajj from September 2 to 17, 2016.

His thoughts on religion were expressed in the books "Grateful for dawning tomorrows" published in 2017 and "Religious tolerance is an integral part of state policy" published in 2020.

On February 16, 2024, by the order of President Ilham Aliyev, until appointment of the chairman of the State Committee on Affairs with Religious Associations of the Republic of Azerbaijan, acting of this position was entrusted to Sayyad Salahli.

== Artistic and journalistic activities ==
Since 1991, he has been a member of the Azerbaijan Writers' Union, since 1998, the Azerbaijan Journalists' Union, since 2002, a member of the "Fuzuli" irfan council of the Transcaucasian Muslims Department, and since 2003, the International Association of Russian-speaking Journalists. Since 2004, he has been represented on the Board of Directors of the Azerbaijan Writers' Union.

During his student years - in 1968–1972, his articles were regularly published in the newspaper "Ganj muallim" (The young teacher) published at the Azerbaijan State Pedagogical Institute under the signature of Sayyad Sadiq. Since 1975, he has appeared in the republican press with his artistic and journalistic writings.

He started his creativity with poetry. The first examples of creativity were published in "Gızıl Ulduz" newspaper published in Imishli. While studying at the Pedagogical Institute, he participated in the circle of the famous poet Zahid Khalil, and his poems were published in the newspaper "Ganj muallim". At that time, he acted as his "deputy" in the association led by the national poet Nariman Hasanzade in the library named after Lenin, in the words of the poet. Composers such as Niyamaddin Musayev, Jabbar Musayev, Shakir Guliyev composed songs for his poems. His prose debut was in 1978. His first work was "Ibish uncle" story published in the 11th edition of "Ulduz" magazine, Baku in 1978. Later, his works were published in "Azerbaijan", "Literature Azerbaijan", "Qrakan Azerbaidjan", "Youth", "Azerbaijan Women", "Pioner" magazines, "Literature and art", "Voice", "525th newspaper", "Road", "Dede Gorgud" and other newspapers. "Bridge" is his first book published in "Ganjlik" publishing house, Baku in 1983.

Doctor of Philology, Professor Akif Huseynov, presented the "Bridge" story as one of the most successful stories of the year at the annual conference devoted to the results of the Azerbaijan Writers' Union in 1985. The 60-year jubilee event of Sayyad Aran was held at the Natavan club of the Azerbaijan Writers' Union on 14 November 2012. Speaking at the jubilee ceremony, the People's Writer of Azerbaijan, Movlud Suleymanli, made a speech at the jubilee ceremony and assessed his performance as follows: Sayyad Aran is a writer who is close to all that is happening – events that surround us. He does not write anything remotely even if it is smallest details. If he does not pass it through himself and does not create intimacy he does not write it. That's why his works are so alive and healthy.

His literary and social activity was awarded with "Progress" medal, "Gold pen" award and "Inam" honors diploma.

== Books ==
- "Bridge" (stories). Baku: "Youth", 1983. (Azerbaijan)
- "Cold solar" (narrative and stories). Baku: "Tabriz", 1996. (Azerbaijan)
- "From chaos to stability" (political-publicist book reflecting the events taking place in the country after Heydar Aliyev's second term in 1992–1997). Baku: 1997. (Azerbaijan)
- "The Nobel Peace Prize looks on the horizon" (political-publicist articles). Baku: 2003. (Azerbaijan)
- "Psychology in the Azerbaijani prose in 1960–80" (monograph on the work of Movlud Suleymanli). Baku: 2004. (Azerbaijan)
- "Heydar Aliyev and Azerbaijan's state oil strategy" ("Heydar Aliyev and Azerbaijan's state oil strategy"). Istanbul: 2009. (Turkey)
- "White paper" (Azerbaijan. "Clean Paper"). (stories and narratives). Istanbul: "Millennium", 2010. (Turkey)
- "Stuck in the box" (stories). Baku: "Law", 2012. (Azerbaijan)
- "Frost" (book of narratives). Baku: "Vektor" Publishing House, 2016 (Azerbaijan)
- "Thanksgiving for the mornings" (a collection of articles and interviews on national and spiritual values). Baku: "Tuna" publishing house, 2017. (Azerbaijan)
- "Headstone" (novel). Baku, "Science and education" publishing house, 2020.
- "Pledge" (stories). Belgrade, Serbia: CZQR "Jovan" Publishing House, 2020 (Serb.)
- "Tombstone" (novel). Istanbul: "Zengin yayncılık" publishing house, 2020 (Turkish)
- "Wake Up" (stories). Tabriz: "Azer-Turan" publishing house, 2021 (Az.) (Persian)
- "Gaybulla's Profit" (stories) Moscow: Ridera publishing house, 2021 (in Russian)
- "Roads to Irevan", (novel), Science and education publishing house, 2021
- "Return of the Crown", (novel), Science and education publishing house, 2022

== Family ==
He is married and has three sons and seven grandchildren.

== Awards ==
- 1988 – "Best Komsomolchu Teacher" badge.
- 2001 – "Golden Pen" Award.
- 2001 – Honorary Citizen of the US state of Texas.
- 2005 (21 June) – "Progress" medal.
- 2005 – Honor diploma "Belief" ("Inam") of the Azerbaijani media.
- 2009 (June) – Laureate of the "Diplomacy of the Year" nomination "Tops-2008" of First Business magazine published in Turkey.
- 2015 (15 July) – "Honored Journalist".
- 2017 (19 May) – International Rasul Rza Award.
- 2019- Jubilee medal of the 100th anniversary of diplomatic services of the Republic of Azerbaijan
- 2021 - He was elected a full member of the International Academy of Sciences of the Turkic World Studies and was awarded the "International Gold Star" medal for his effective activities in the direction of the development of the culture and science of the Turkic world and the Turkish-Azerbaijani fraternal relations.
- 2021 — He was awarded the international award named after Shahmar Akbarzade of "Vector" International Academy of Sciences
- 2022- Order of “Shohrat” for efficient activities in the field of civil service.
- 2022 — He was awarded the "Mahmud Kashgari" award established by the International Foundation named after Mahmud Kashgari for promoting Turkish culture in the world and promoting it in a wide area.
- 2022 — Awarded the international "Medal of Honor of the Turkish World" by the Professional Association of Owners of Scientific and Literary Works of Turkey (ILESAM)
- 2022 – He was awarded with a special diploma of the Azerbaijan Writers' Union
- 2024 – "100th anniversary of Heydar Aliyev (1923–2023)" jubilee medal
