= Rafiq Tağı =

Rafiq Tağı, born Rafig Nazir oglu Taghiyev (5 August 1950, Khoshchobanly, Masally District, Azerbaijan — 23 November 2011, Baku, Azerbaijan) was an Azerbaijani short story writer and a journalist who worked for Sanat newspaper until police arrested him and Sanat editor Samir Sadagatoglu for writing "Europe and Us", an article that was deemed to be critical of Islam and the Islamic prophet Muhammad. He was considered to be inciting racial hatred and sentenced to three years in prison. Released on a presidential pardon some months later he was assassinated in a car park.

== Biography ==
Rafig Nazir oglu Taghiyev was born in the village of Khoshchobanly, Masally District, Azerbaijan. He graduated from the Azerbaijan State Medical University and worked as a physician in rural parts of Azerbaijan. He later received a degree in cardiology from the I.M. Sechenov First Moscow State Medical University. Beginning in 1990, he worked at the Emergency Medical Services Hospital in Baku.

A journalist whose works had been published in both Azerbaijani and foreign media, Tağı over his career became particularly known as an author of six collected prose books and a number of controversial articles. His membership at the Writers' Union of Azerbaijan of which he had been a member for 16 years was revoked after he wrote a critical essay analysing social and political views of the renowned Soviet-era Azerbaijani poet Samad Vurghun. Another article entitled Europe and Us published in 2006 in the newspaper Sanat provoked protests in Azerbaijan and Iran, as well as a fatwa pronouncing the death penalty from Grand Ayatollah Fazel Lankarani.

In 2006, some residents of the village of Nardaran, "a stronghold for Shia Islamists" in Azerbaijan, during their demonstrations demanded severe punishment for Tağı. Protesters carried placards saying "Death to Israel!" and all speeches were met with a loud "Allahu Akbar!" Hajiagha Nuriyev, chairman of Azerbaijan's unregistered Islamic Party, said that Tağı was "acting on behalf of international Zionism and Armenia".

In 2007 the Azerbaijan Court of Appeals in absentia of the culprits rejected the appeals request filed by Tağı and editor Sadagatoglu. He was accused of promoting religious hatred and was sentenced to four years in jail for instigating religious hostility. After 8 months of imprisonment with a presidential pardon, he was released.

He was a member of the Free Writers Union, and regular writer of Alatoran literary magazine.

== Death ==
Rafiq Tağı died on 23 November 2011 after being stabbing on 19 November in a car park near his home. In an interview he gave from the hospital just one day prior to his death, Rafiq Tağı stated his stabbing could be an act of retaliation for the article Iran and the Inevitability of Globalization he had published on 10 November 2011 and in which he criticised Iranian president Mahmoud Ahmadinejad for "discrediting Islam."

Tağı's family voiced concerns that no one had been held liable for the murder a week after the event and informed of their intention to sue the Ministry of Health and the chief physician of the clinic where Tağı had died for negligence causing death. In addition, they announced their plans to seek political asylum in a Western country.

On 15 December 2011, the European Parliament passed a resolution in which it condemned the murder of Rafiq Tağı.

== Reaction ==
=== In Azerbaijan ===
Investigative journalist and Tağı's fellow columnist Khadija Ismayilova blames the assassination on radical Islamists who are working closely with Iran's secret intelligence.

Whistleblower Elshad Abdullayev believes Ministry of National Security general Akif Chovdarov is responsible for the assassination.

=== In Iran ===
The Iranian embassy in Baku denied all allegations that Iran was somehow linked to the assassination and called them "ungrounded."

On his website, ayatollah Mohammad Javad Lankarani, the son of the fatwa-issuing ayatollah Mohammad Fazel Lankarani who himself died in 2007, published a statement in which he praised the killers for "sending the reprobate who insulted the prophet to hell" and was assured that Muslim youths would not let "the intrigues of global imperialism and Zionism be carried on."

In this case, the dissident jurist, Mohsen Kadivar, engaged in a heated moral and legal debate over the legitimacy of the Fatwa with the son of the recently deceased Ayatollah. He argued that the Fatwa's extraterritorial enforcement was inhumane, sacrilegious, and unconstitutional.

== See also ==
- Islamism
- List of journalists killed in Europe

== Bibliography ==
- Kadivar, Mohsen. Blasphemy and Apostasy in Islam: Debates in Shi'a Jurisprudence. United Kingdom, Edinburgh University Press, 2023.
