= Xubyarlı =

Xubyarlı may refer to:

- Xubyarlı, Imishli, Azerbaijan
- Xubyarlı, Jabrayil, Azerbaijan
