= Muradxanlı =

Muradxanlı or Muradkhanly or Myurdkhany refer to:

- Muradxanlı, Imishli, Azerbaijan
- Muradxanlı, Qubadli, Azerbaijan
