= Hacıbabalı =

- Location within Azerbaijan
- Coordinates: 39°44′50″N 47°58′45″E
- Country: Azerbaijan
- Rayon: Imishli
- Time zone: UTC+4 (AZT)
  - Summer (DST): UTC+5 (AZT)

Hacıbabalı (also, Gadzhhibabaly) is a village in the Imishli Rayon of Azerbaijan.
