= Oruçlu =

Oruçlu may refer to:

== Places ==
=== Azerbaijan ===
- Oruçlu, Kalbajar, a village in the Kalbajar Rayon
- Oruclu, Imishli, a village and municipality in the Imishli Rayon

=== Turkey ===
- Oruçlu, Artvin, a village in the central (Artvin) district of Artvin Province
- Oruçlu, Feke, a village in the district of Feke, Adana Province
- Oruçlu, Kozan, a village in the district of Kozan, Adana Province
