= Vətəgə =

Village in Azerbaijan

Coordinates: 39.78838°N 47.93213°E

Vətəgə is a village in the municipality of Sarıxanlı in the Imishli Rayon of Azerbaijan.
