= Mamedli =

Mamedli may refer to:

- Mamedli, Imishli, Azerbaijan
- Mamedli, Qubadli, Azerbaijan

== See also ==
- Məmmədli (disambiguation)
