= Laman, Azerbaijan =

Laman, Azerbaijan may refer to:

- Laman, Khachmaz
- Laman, Lerik
