= Telişli =

- Municipality
- Location within Azerbaijan
- Coordinates: 40°06′58″N 48°04′56″E
- Country: Azerbaijan
- Rayon: Imishli

Population
  - Total: 789
- Time zone: UTC+4 (AZT)
  - Summer (DST): UTC+5 (AZT)

Telişli (also known as Temishli) is a village and municipality in the Imishli Rayon of Azerbaijan. It has a population of 789.
