= Qaravəlili, Imishli =

Qaravəlili
- Municipality
- Location within Azerbaijan
- Coordinates: 39°54′48″N 48°12′30″E
- Country: Azerbaijan
- Rayon: Imishli

Population
  - Total: 942
- Time zone: UTC+4 (AZT)
  - Summer (DST): UTC+5 (AZT)

Qaravəlili (also, Qarəvəlli and Karavelli) is a village and municipality in the Imishli Rayon of Azerbaijan. It has a population of 942.
