= Göhərli =

- Municipality
- Location within Azerbaijan
- Coordinates: 39°48′56″N 48°03′47″E
- Country: Azerbaijan
- Rayon: Imishli

Population
  - Total: 867
- Time zone: UTC+4 (AZT)
  - Summer (DST): UTC+5 (AZT)

Göhərli (also, Gëkharli and Gyukharly) is a village and municipality in the Imishli Rayon of Azerbaijan. It has a population of 867.
