= Sarıxanlı =

- Municipality
- Location within Azerbaijan
- Coordinates: 39°48′54″N 47°55′15″E
- Country: Azerbaijan
- Rayon: Imishli

Population
  - Total: 15.252
- Time zone: UTC+4 (AZT)
  - Summer (DST): UTC+5 (AZT)

Sarıxanlı (also, Sarxanlı and Sarykhanly) is a village and the most populous municipality, except the capital Imishli, in the Imishli Rayon of Azerbaijan. It has a population of 15,252. The municipality consists of the villages of Sarıxanlı and Vətəgə.
