= Qulubəyli =

Gulubeyli
- Municipality
- Azerbaijani: Qulubəyli
- Location within Azerbaijan
- Coordinates: 39°46′35″N 48°08′41″E
- Country: Azerbaijan
- District: Imishli

Population
  - Total: 2,647
- Time zone: UTC+4 (AZT)
  - Summer (DST): UTC+5 (AZT)

Qulubəyli (Gulubeyli) is a village and municipality in the Imishli District of Azerbaijan. It has a population of 2,647.

== Notable natives ==
- Imamverdi Aliyev — National Hero of Azerbaijan.
