= Çahar =

- Municipality
- Location within Azerbaijan
- Coordinates: 39°47′52″N 48°03′31″E
- Country: Azerbaijan
- Rayon: Imishli

Population
  - Total: 1,156
- Time zone: UTC+4 (AZT)
  - Summer (DST): UTC+5 (AZT)

Çahar (also, Chakhar) is a village and municipality in the Imishli Rayon of Azerbaijan. It has a population of 1,156.
