= Otuziki =

- Municipality
- Location within Azerbaijan
- Coordinates: 39°50′50″N 48°05′15″E
- Country: Azerbaijan
- Rayon: Imishli

Population
  - Total: 1,399
- Time zone: UTC+4 (AZT)
  - Summer (DST): UTC+5 (AZT)

Otuziki (also, Verkhniy Otuziki) is a village and municipality in the Imishli Rayon of Azerbaijan. It has a population of 1,399.
