= Yalavac =

- Municipality
- Location within Azerbaijan
- Coordinates: 39°50′N 48°04′E
- Country: Azerbaijan
- Rayon: Imishli

Population
  - Total: 2,879
- Time zone: UTC+4 (AZT)
  - Summer (DST): UTC+5 (AZT)

Yalavac (also, Yalavadzh) is a village and municipality in the Imishli Rayon of Azerbaijan. It has a population of 2,879.

== Bibliography ==
- Yalavac (as Yalavadzh) at GEOnet Names Server
