= Imishli (city) =

Imishli İmişli
- City & Municipality
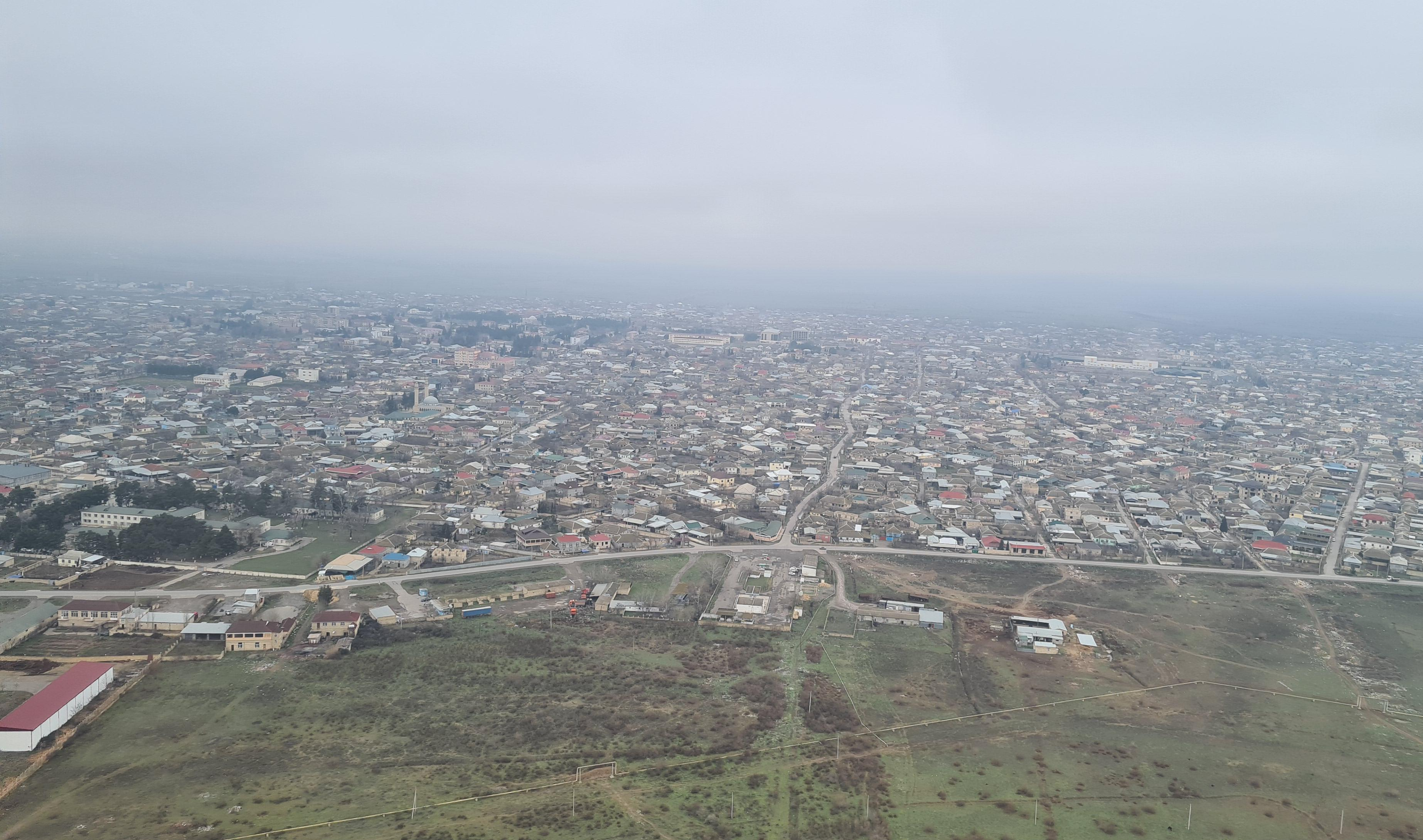

- Location within Azerbaijan
- Coordinates: 39°52′11″N 48°03′36″E
- Country: Azerbaijan
- District: Imishli
- Established: 1930

Area
  - Total: 1,826 km^{2} (705 sq mi)
- Elevation: 0 m (0 ft)

Population (2014)
  - Total: 31,310
- Time zone: UTC+4 (AZT)
- Area code: +994 154
- Website: Official website

Imishli (Azerbaijani: İmişli) is a city and the capital of the Imishli District of Azerbaijan.

== History ==
During the Tsardom of Russia, Qaradonlu belonged to the Javad Khan administration. In 1906, the first school of the Qaradonlu region was established, with many living-buildings, caravanserais, mills and shops in the area. In August 1930, Qaradonlu was organized in Mil-Mugan as a region. As early as the October Revolution, land-reclamation and irrigation work were made based on the intense irrigated plant-growing.

In 1933, Qaradonlu Machine-Tractor Plant was built in the Qaradonlu historical region. As a result of the construction of the railway between Ələt and Yerevan, people moved from the center of the region to the suburbs of the railway stations. The population increase produced two-story brick buildings in Qaradonlu and Imishli. The regional capital was moved there, and the region became the Imishli District. Imishli village also expanded. Government houses were constructed, completely transforming the village's appearance.

In 1944, Imishli was awarded the status of town-type settlement, progressing to city status in the 1960s. In 1959, on the Aras River in the Bəhramtəpə area, water storage was used - which was unique in that time period.

== Notable people ==
- Niyameddin Musayev (Azerbaijani: Niyaməddin Cabbar oğlu Musayev, Azerbaijani singer and composer, was born in Imishii District

== Infrastructure ==
The Qaradonlu region is situated in a favorable area near the Aras River providing water resources, productive land, and caravan roads. The Bash Mugam and Azizbaiov irrigation canals provide water to the land area of Imishli and to land areas of the Bilasuvar District and Saatly District.

== Culture ==
=== Sports ===
The city has one professional football team, Mil-Muğan, currently competing in the second-flight of Azerbaijani football, the Azerbaijan First Division.

== Gallery ==
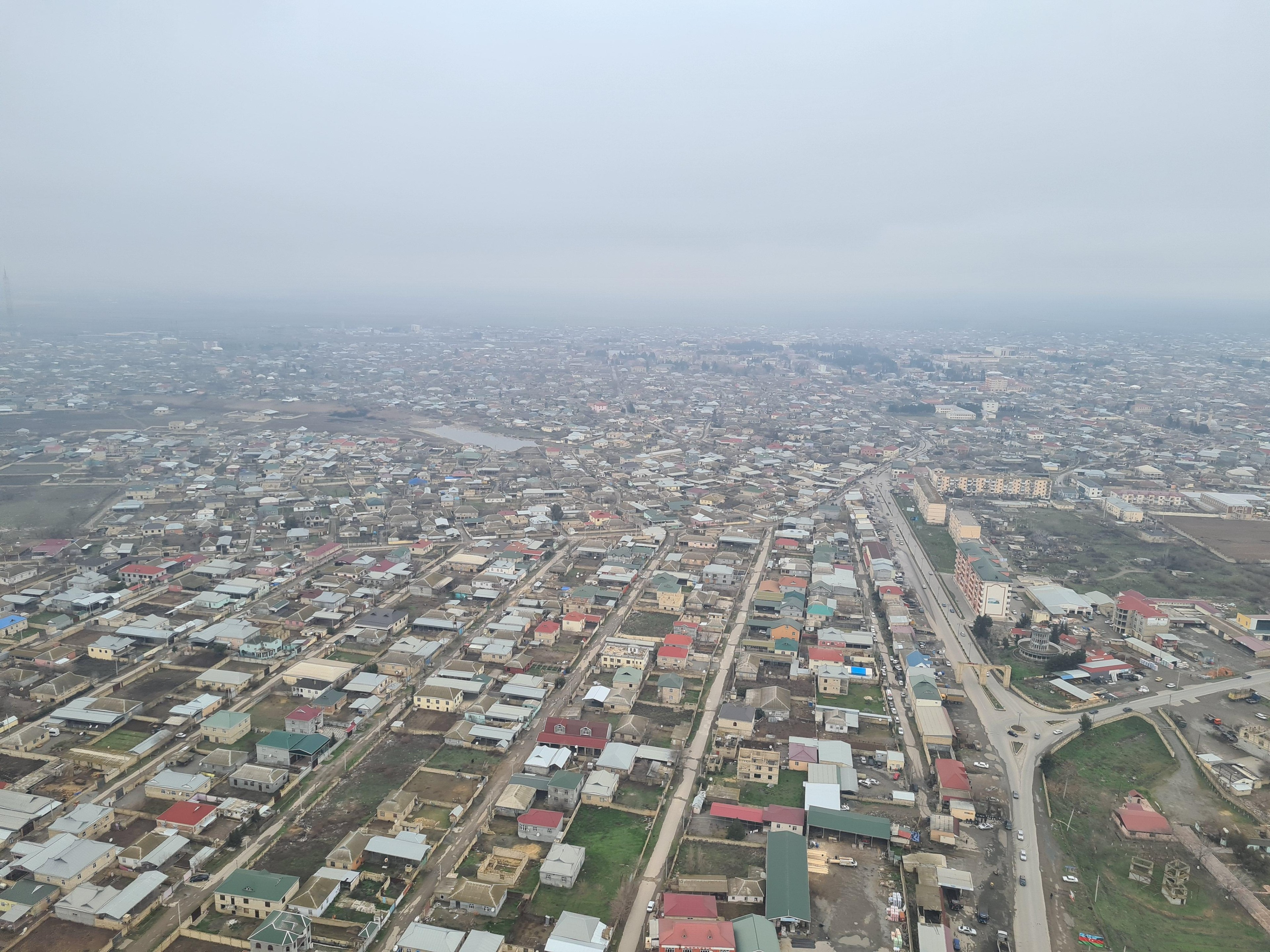

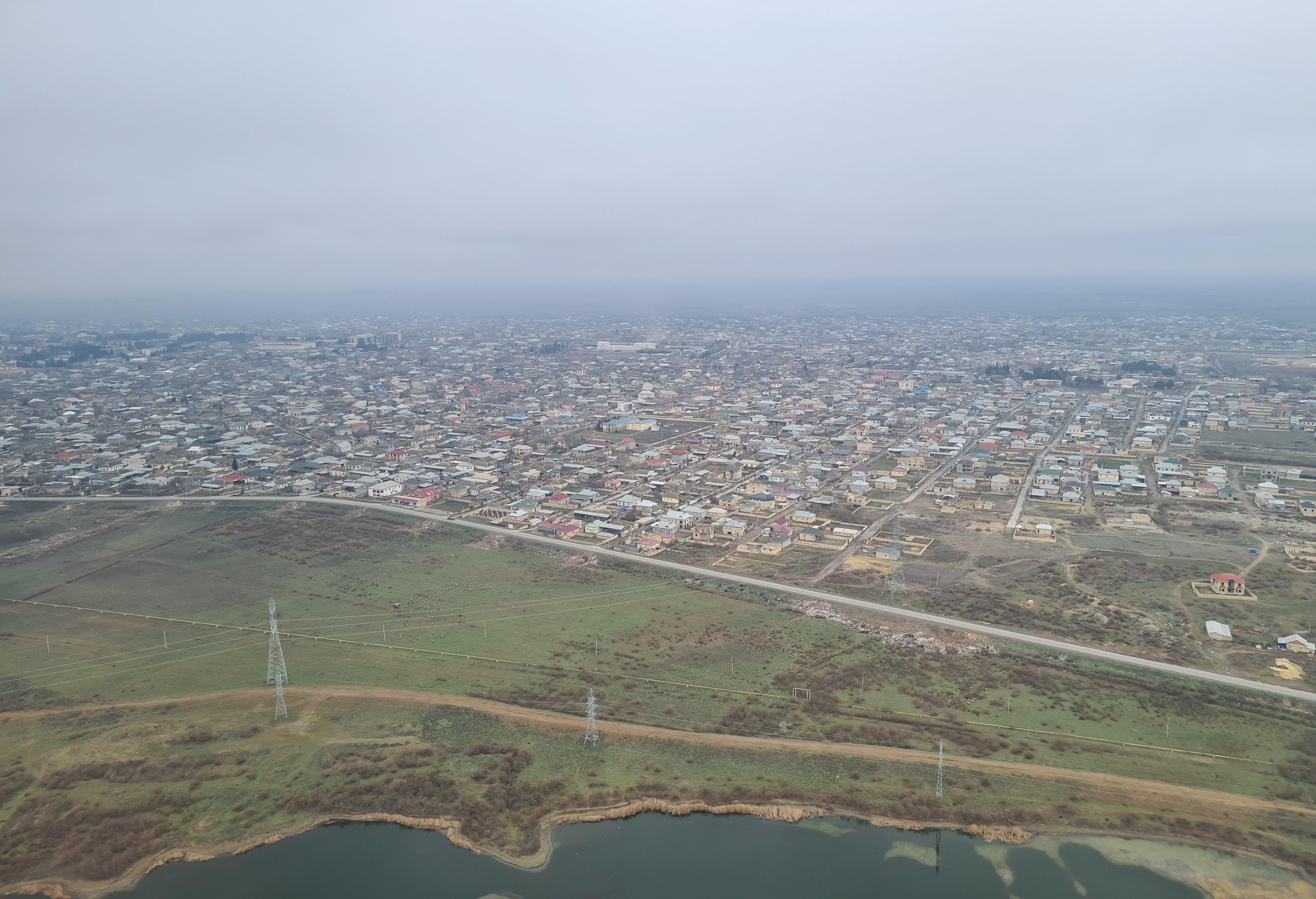
