= Ölcələr =

- Municipality
- Location within Azerbaijan
- Coordinates: 39°48′36″N 48°05′18″E
- Country: Azerbaijan
- Rayon: Imishli

Population
  - Total: 498
- Time zone: UTC+4 (AZT)
  - Summer (DST): UTC+5 (AZT)

Ölcələr (also, Olcalar, Kuybyshev, Ol’dzhalyar, and Ülcälär) is a village and municipality in the Imishli Rayon of Azerbaijan. It has a population of 498.
