= Məhəmmədli =

Coordinates: 39°50′N 48°01′E

Məhəmmədli is a village and municipality in the Imishli Rayon of Azerbaijan. It has a population of 581.
