= Ağamalılar =

- Municipality
- Location within Azerbaijan
- Coordinates: 40°05′47″N 47°49′16″E
- Country: Azerbaijan
- Rayon: Imishli

Population
  - Total: 542
- Time zone: UTC+4 (AZT)
  - Summer (DST): UTC+5 (AZT)

Ağamalılar (also, Ağamallar and Agamalylar) is a village and municipality in the Imishli Rayon of Azerbaijan. It has a population of 542.
