= Aşağı Qaragüvəndli =

- Location within Azerbaijan
- Coordinates: 39°43′09″N 47°55′01″E
- Country: Azerbaijan
- Rayon: Imishli
- Time zone: UTC+4 (AZT)
  - Summer (DST): UTC+5 (AZT)

Aşağı Qaragüvəndli (also, Ashaga Karakyuvendikly and Ashagy Karagyuvyandli) is a village in the Imishli Rayon of Azerbaijan.
