= Ağcüyür =

- Municipality
- Location within Azerbaijan
- Coordinates: 39°54′N 48°12′E
- Country: Azerbaijan
- Rayon: Imishli

Population
  - Total: 382
- Time zone: UTC+4 (AZT)
  - Summer (DST): UTC+5 (AZT)

Ağcüyür (also, Agdzhuvur and Agzhur) is a village and the least populous municipality in the Imishli Rayon of Azerbaijan. It has a population of 382.
