= Qaraçı, Azerbaijan =

Qaraçı
- Municipality
- Location within Azerbaijan
- Coordinates: 41°26′36″N 48°50′33″E
- Country: Azerbaijan
- Rayon: Khachmaz

Population
  - Total: 785
- Time zone: UTC+4 (AZT)
  - Summer (DST): UTC+5 (AZT)

Qaraçı (also, Karachay and Karachy) is a village and municipality in the Khachmaz Rayon of Azerbaijan. It has a population of 785. The municipality consists of the villages of Qaraçı, Qaraqaşlı, Laman, and Çaxmaqlı.
