= Cəfərli, Imishli =

Cəfərli
- Municipality
- Location within Azerbaijan
- Coordinates: 39°54′25″N 48°01′05″E
- Country: Azerbaijan
- District: Imishli

Population
  - Total: 3,509
- Time zone: UTC+4 (AZT)

Cəfərli (also, Jafarli and Jafarly) is a village and municipality in the Imishli District of Azerbaijan. It has a population of 3,509. The municipality consists of the villages of Cəfərli and Hacımustafalı.
