= Şahverdili =

- Municipality
- Location within Azerbaijan
- Coordinates: 39°47′49″N 47°59′13″E
- Country: Azerbaijan
- Rayon: Imishli

Population
  - Total: 1,315
- Time zone: UTC+4 (AZT)
  - Summer (DST): UTC+5 (AZT)

Şahverdili (also, Şəhverdili, Shakhverdili, and Shakh-Verdylyar) is a village and municipality in the Imishli Rayon of Azerbaijan. It has a population of 1,315.
