= Boşçalılar =

Boshchalylar
- Municipality
- Azerbaijani: Boşçalılar
- Location within Azerbaijan
- Coordinates: 39°48′56″N 47°57′34″E
- Country: Azerbaijan
- District: Imishli

Population
  - Total: 1,583
- Time zone: UTC+4 (AZT)
  - Summer (DST): UTC+5 (AZT)

Boşçalılar (also, Boshchalylar, Boshalar, Boşçallar, and Boshchallar) is a village and municipality in the Imishli District of Azerbaijan. It has a population of 1,583.
