= Çaxırlı, Imishli =

Çaxırlı
- Municipality
- Location within Azerbaijan
- Coordinates: 39°44′36″N 48°01′05″E
- Country: Azerbaijan
- Rayon: Imishli

Population
  - Total: 1,550
- Time zone: UTC+4 (AZT)
  - Summer (DST): UTC+5 (AZT)

Çaxırlı (also, Chakhirly and Chakhyrly) is a village and municipality in the Imishli Rayon of Azerbaijan. It has a population of 1,550.
