= Mamedli, Imishli =

Mamedli
- Location within Azerbaijan
- Coordinates: 39°49′N 48°03′E
- Country: Azerbaijan
- Rayon: Imishli
- Time zone: UTC+4 (AZT)
  - Summer (DST): UTC+5 (AZT)

Mamedli is a village in the Imishli Rayon of Azerbaijan.
