= Yuxarı Qaragüvəndli =

- Location within Azerbaijan
- Coordinates: 39°43′09″N 47°54′08″E
- Country: Azerbaijan
- Rayon: Imishli
- Time zone: UTC+4 (AZT)

Yuxarı Qaragüvəndli (also, Yukhary Karagyuvyandli and Yukhary-Karakyuvendikly) is a village in the Imishli Rayon of Azerbaijan.
