= Nurulu =

- Municipality
- Location within Azerbaijan
- Coordinates: 39°49′12″N 48°06′58″E
- Country: Azerbaijan
- Rayon: Imishli

Population
  - Total: 786
- Time zone: UTC+4 (AZT)
  - Summer (DST): UTC+5 (AZT)

Nurulu (also, Nuruly) is a village and municipality in the Imishli Rayon of Azerbaijan. It has a population of 786.
