= Kürdmahmudlu =

- Municipality
- Location within Azerbaijan
- Coordinates: 39°48′35″N 48°12′33″E
- Country: Azerbaijan
- Rayon: Imishli

Population
  - Total: 2,156
- Time zone: UTC+4 (AZT)
  - Summer (DST): UTC+5 (AZT)

Kürdmahmudlu (also, Kyurdmakhmudlu and Kyur-Makhmudly) is a village and municipality in the Imishli Rayon of Azerbaijan. It has a population of 2,156.
