= Məzrəli, Imishli =

Məzrəli
- Municipality
- Location within Azerbaijan
- Coordinates: 39°46′09″N 48°01′53″E
- Country: Azerbaijan
- Rayon: Imishli

Population
  - Total: 3,320
- Time zone: UTC+4 (AZT)
  - Summer (DST): UTC+5 (AZT)

Məzrəli is a village and municipality in the Imishli Rayon of Azerbaijan. It has a population of 3,320.
