= Muradalılı =

- Municipality
- Location within Azerbaijan
- Coordinates: 39°49′11″N 48°06′33″E
- Country: Azerbaijan
- Rayon: Imishli

Population
  - Total: 799
- Time zone: UTC+4 (AZT)
  - Summer (DST): UTC+5 (AZT)

Muradalılı (also, Muradally) is a village and municipality in the Imishli Rayon of Azerbaijan. It has a population of 799.
