= Soltanmuradlı =

- Municipality
- Location within Azerbaijan
- Coordinates: 39°48′N 48°05′E
- Country: Azerbaijan
- Rayon: Imishli

Population
  - Total: 876
- Time zone: UTC+4 (AZT)

Soltanmuradlı (also, Soltanmuradly) is a village and municipality in the Imishli Rayon of Azerbaijan. It has a population of 876.
