= Əliyetməzli =

- Municipality
- Location within Azerbaijan
- Coordinates: 40°07′52″N 48°01′58″E
- Country: Azerbaijan
- Rayon: Imishli

Population
  - Total: 544
- Time zone: UTC+4 (AZT)
  - Summer (DST): UTC+5 (AZT)

Əliyetməzli is a village and municipality in the Imishli Rayon of Azerbaijan. It has a population of 544.
