= Aranlı, Imishli =

Aranly
- Azerbaijani: Aranlı
- Location within Azerbaijan
- Coordinates: 39°42′04″N 48°06′15″E
- Country: Azerbaijan
- District: Imishli

Population
  - Total: 7,145
- Time zone: UTC+4 (AZT)
  - Summer (DST): UTC+5 (AZT)

Aranlı (Aranly, known as Poltavka until 1999) is a village and municipality in the Imishli District of Azerbaijan. It has a population of 7,145.
