= Rəsullu, Imishli =

Rəsullu
- Municipality
- Location within Azerbaijan
- Coordinates: 39°50′12″N 48°01′43″E
- Country: Azerbaijan
- Rayon: Imishli

Population
  - Total: 1,369
- Time zone: UTC+4 (AZT)

Rəsullu (also, Rassuli and Rassuly) is a village and municipality in the Imishli Rayon of Azerbaijan. It has a population of 1,369.
