= Hacımustafalı =

Village in Azerbaijan

Coordinates: 39.9081°N 48.0263°E

Hacımustafalı is a village in the municipality of Cəfərli in the Imishli Rayon of Azerbaijan.
