= Qaraqaşlı, Agsu =

Qaraqaşlı
- Municipality
- Location within Azerbaijan
- Coordinates: 40°30′04″N 48°24′22″E
- Country: Azerbaijan
- Rayon: Agsu

Population
  - Total: 1,458
- Time zone: UTC+4 (AZT)
  - Summer (DST): UTC+5 (AZT)

Qaraqaşlı (also, Karagashli and Karakashly) is a village and municipality in the Agsu Rayon of Azerbaijan. It has a population of 1,458.
