= Ağaməmmədli, Tovuz =

Ağaməmmədli
- Location within Azerbaijan
- Coordinates: 40°51′34″N 45°43′36″E
- Country: Azerbaijan
- Rayon: Tovuz
- Time zone: UTC+4 (AZT)
  - Summer (DST): UTC+5 (AZT)

Ağaməmmədli (also, Agamamedli and Agmamedly) is a village in the Tovuz Rayon of Azerbaijan.
