= Qaralar, Qubadli =

Qaralar
- Location within Azerbaijan
- Coordinates: 39°13′28″N 46°43′17″E
- Country: Azerbaijan
- Rayon: Qubadli
- Time zone: UTC+4 (AZT)
  - Summer (DST): UTC+5 (AZT)

Qaralar (also, Karalar) is a village in the Qubadli Rayon of Azerbaijan.
