= Muradlı, Agsu =

Muradlı
- Municipality
- Location within Azerbaijan
- Coordinates: 40°32′17″N 48°20′46″E
- Country: Azerbaijan
- Rayon: Agsu

Population
  - Total: 552
- Time zone: UTC+4 (AZT)
  - Summer (DST): UTC+5 (AZT)

Muradlı (also, Muradly) is a village and municipality in the Agsu Rayon of Azerbaijan. It has a population of 552.
