= Qaralar, Sabirabad =

Qaralar
- Municipality
- Location within Armenia
- Coordinates: 40°03′06″N 48°32′30″E
- Country: Azerbaijan
- Rayon: Sabirabad

Population
  - Total: 776
- Time zone: UTC+4 (AZT)
  - Summer (DST): UTC+5 (AZT)

Qaralar (also, Karalar and Karaly) is a village and municipality in the Sabirabad Rayon of Azerbaijan. It has a population of 776.
