= Çaxmaqlı =

- Location within Azerbaijan
- Coordinates: 41°26′38″N 48°52′02″E
- Country: Azerbaijan
- Rayon: Khachmaz
- Municipality: Qaraçı
- Time zone: UTC+4 (AZT)
  - Summer (DST): UTC+5 (AZT)

Çaxmaqlı (also, Chakhmakhly) is a village in the Khachmaz Rayon of Azerbaijan. The village forms part of the municipality of Qaraçı.
