= Suvorovka, Altai Krai =

Suvorovka Суворовка
- Selo
- Location within Altai Krai Location within Russia
- Coordinates: 52°48′N 80°07′E
- Country: Russia
- Region: Altai Krai
- District: Blagoveshchensky District
- Time zone: UTC+7:00

Suvorovka (Russian: Суворовка) is a rural locality (a selo) and the administrative center of Suvorovsky Selsoviet, Blagoveshchensky District, Altai Krai, Russia. The population was 555 as of 2013. It was founded in 1908. There are 6 streets.

== Geography ==
Suvorovka is located 23 km southeast of Blagoveshchenka (the district's administrative centre) by road. Pregradinka is the nearest rural locality.
