= Mürsəlli, Sabirabad =

Mürsəlli
- Municipality
- Location within Azerbaijan
- Coordinates: 40°06′03″N 48°35′11″E
- Country: Azerbaijan
- Rayon: Sabirabad

Population
  - Total: 1,456
- Time zone: UTC+4 (AZT)
  - Summer (DST): UTC+5 (AZT)

Mürsəlli (also, Myursali and Myursally) is a village and municipality in the Sabirabad Rayon of Azerbaijan. It has a population of 1,456.
