= Qaralar, Tovuz =

Qaralar
- Municipality
- Location within Azerbaijan
- Coordinates: 40°44′43″N 45°28′11″E
- Country: Azerbaijan
- Rayon: Tovuz

Population
  - Total: 254
- Time zone: UTC+4 (AZT)
  - Summer (DST): UTC+5 (AZT)

Qaralar (also, Karalar) is a village and municipality in the Tovuz Rayon of Azerbaijan. It has a population of 254.
