= Mürsəlli, Imishli =

Mürsəlli
- Municipality
- Location within Azerbaijan
- Coordinates: 39°52′04″N 48°11′38″E
- Country: Azerbaijan
- Rayon: Imishli

Population
  - Total: 872
- Time zone: UTC+4 (AZT)
  - Summer (DST): UTC+5 (AZT)

Mürsəlli (also, Myursali and Myursalli) is a village and municipality in the Imishli Rayon of Azerbaijan. It has a population of 872.
