= Qaraqaşlı, Khachmaz =

Qaraqaşlı
- Location within Azerbaijan
- Coordinates: 41°25′48″N 48°53′05″E
- Country: Azerbaijan
- Rayon: Khachmaz
- Municipality: Qaraçı
- Time zone: UTC+4 (AZT)
  - Summer (DST): UTC+5 (AZT)

Qaraqaşlı (also, Karakashly) is a village in the Khachmaz Rayon of Azerbaijan. The village forms part of the municipality of Qaraçı.
