= Bəcirəvan, Imishli =

Bəcirəvan
- Municipality
- Location within Azerbaijan
- Coordinates: 39°54′21″N 48°10′21″E
- Country: Azerbaijan
- Rayon: Imishli

Population
  - Total: 2,137
- Time zone: UTC+4 (AZT)
  - Summer (DST): UTC+5 (AZT)

Bəcirəvan (also, Bacirəvan, Badzhiravan, and Bodzherevan) is a village and municipality in the Imishli Rayon of Azerbaijan. It has a population of 2,137.
