= Sərxanlı =

- Municipality
- Location within Azerbaijan
- Coordinates: 39°33′34″N 45°00′41″E
- Country: Azerbaijan
- Autonomous republic: Nakhchivan
- District: Sharur

Population (2005)
  - Total: 526
- Time zone: UTC+4 (AZT)

Sərxanlı (also, Sarkhanly and Sarykhanly) is a village and municipality in the Sharur District of Nakhchivan, Azerbaijan. Its population is busy with foddering, vegetable-growing and beet-growing. There is a secondary school, club and a medical center in the village. It has a population of 526.

== Etymology ==
Since 2003, the name of the village is officially registered as Sərxanlı (Sarkhanly). The name is reflect in itself of the name of the sarıxanlı (sarykhanly) arm of the təklə (takla) tribe. The tekle tribe is one of the Seljug tribes. The tekle tribe which previously lived in Turkey, in 1540, were accepted the obedience of the Tahmasp I (1524-1576) under the leadership of the Gazi Khan within the tribe union of şahsevənlər. According to sources of the 19th century, the təklələr (taklas) consisted from the 14 tribes and different generations on the Muğan and Garabagh plains. Later, they were separated to the a few arms.
