= Muradxanlı, Imishli =

Muradxanlı
- Municipality
- Location within Azerbaijan
- Coordinates: 39°55′44″N 47°57′06″E
- Country: Azerbaijan
- Rayon: Imishli

Population
  - Total: 3,900
- Time zone: UTC+4 (AZT)
  - Summer (DST): UTC+5 (AZT)

Muradxanlı (also, Muradkhanly and Myurakhany) is a village and municipality in the Imishli Rayon of Azerbaijan. It has a population of 3900
