= Qaralar-e Lotfollah =

Qaralar-e Lotfollah قرالرلطف الله
- Village
- Location within Iran
- Coordinates: 37°40′33″N 45°03′31″E
- Country: Iran
- Province: West Azerbaijan
- County: Urmia
- Bakhsh: Central
- Rural District: Nazluy-ye Jonubi

Population (2006)
  - Total: 87
- Time zone: UTC+3:30 (IRST)
  - Summer (DST): UTC+4:30 (IRDT)

Qaralar-e Lotfollah (Persian: قرالرلطف الله, also Romanized as Qarālar-e Loţfollāh; also known as Qarālar-e Loţfollāh Beyg) is a village in Nazluy-ye Jonubi Rural District, in the Central District of Urmia County, West Azerbaijan Province, Iran. At the 2006 census, its population was 87, in 29 families.
