= Urshanabad =

Urshanabad اورشان اباد
- Village
- Country: Iran
- Province: East Azerbaijan
- County: Khoda Afarin
- Bakhsh: Minjavan
- Rural District: Minjavan-e Sharqi

Population (2006)
  - Total: 46
- Time zone: UTC+3:30 (IRST)
  - Summer (DST): UTC+4:30 (IRDT)

Urshanabad (Persian: اورشان اباد, also Romanized as Ūrshānābād; also known as Qarehlar) is a village in Minjavan-e Sharqi Rural District, Minjavan District, Khoda Afarin County, East Azerbaijan Province, Iran. At the 2006 census, its population was 46, in 12 families.
