= Chakmak =

Indian children's science magazine

- Editor: Sushil Shukla, Shashi Sablok
- Categories: Children's magazine
- Frequency: Monthly
- Founded: 1985
- First issue: July 1985
- Company: Eklavya Foundation
- Country: India
- Based in: Bhopal
- Language: Hindi

Chakmak (Hindi: चकमक) is a children's science monthly magazine published by the Eklavya foundation, a non-profit organization that supports critical and creative thinking in schools.

== History ==
Chakmak was launched in July 1985. The magazine is published by Eklavya, a non-profit organisation established in 1982 to conduct research and develop curricula for school education in India. The motivating force to launch Chakmak was to provide children studying in middle schools with supplementary reading material in science so that their school learning could be suitably reinforced.

Chakmak was refurbished into a new coloured format in November 2007 by children's illustrator Atanu Roy. It continues with many columns by eminent writers, scientists and painters like Jayant Narlikar, Gulzar, Nida Fazli, Ashok Vajpai, Dilip Chinchalkar, Asgar Wajahat Shah, Abid Surti and many more, as well as budding authors. October 2011 issue of Chakmak was its 300th issue - a landmark effort initiated by a non-profit organisation in India. The impact of Chakmak can be seen in the form of thousands of stories, poems, and illustrations.

== Objective ==
Chakmak had a wider objective from the time of its launch – to reach out into the Hindi speaking belt of central and north India as a definitive children's magazine, biased heavily towards science, that could spur the creativity and curiosity of children entering the teenage years, encourage and inculcate in them a reading habit and make learning and the acquisition of knowledge a process of fun and enjoyment. Science and ‘scientific thinking’ was the edifice around which the content was structured. So, there were articles on science and on the history of science, all seeking to change children's perception of science as a subject. In addition, many experiments that children could perform at home with available materials gleaned from their surroundings were also published in the hope of encouraging them to take up experiment-based learning. In the same vein, there were puzzles and brain teasers and many do-it-yourself columns for making toys and gadgets, origami and art, again based on home-made dyes and materials. It was perceived that such content would awaken the creativity and problem-solving abilities of children. Children were also encouraged to send in their poems, writings and drawings and several pages were devoted to publishing their contributions, again to encourage creativity in writing and art and to give them a sense of ownership and closeness with the magazine.

== Region of impact ==
Madhya Pradesh, Bihar, Uttar Pradesh, Haryana, Punjab, Maharashtra, Delhi, Chhattisgarh, Uttarakhand and Rajasthan.

== Other impact ==
NCERT and Delhi SCERT reproduced a lot of material from Chakmak in school text books Pitara, Spectrum, Navduniya, Dainik Hindustan, Indradhanush regularly carry material from Chakmak. Chakmak encourages children's original writing and illustration. Four books were published from children's contributions and sold over 2,50,000 copies. In recognition of its contribution to popularising science among children, Chakmak won an award from the National Council for Science and Technology Communication in the mid-'80s.

== Reader's profile ==
Children seven to 15 years old, School Teachers, Educators, NGOs, B.Ed., B. El. Ed, D. El. Ed, MA education students.

== Team ==
- Editors: Sushil Shukla, Shashi Sablok
- Assistant Editor: Mitali Ahir, Kavita Tiwari
- Editorial consultant: Rex D.Rozario
- Science Consultant: Sushil Joshi
- Designer: Dilip Chinchalkar
- Circulation: Jhanak Sahu
