= Kyzylkend =

- Location within Armenia Location within Shirak
- Coordinates: 41°03′N 43°35′E
- Country: Armenia
- Marz (Province): Shirak
- Time zone: UTC+4 ( )
  - Summer (DST): UTC+5 ( )

Kyzylkend is a town in the Shirak Province of Armenia.
