= Qaralar, Beylagan =

Qaralar
- Location within Azerbaijan
- Coordinates: 39°46′24″N 47°53′45″E
- Country: Azerbaijan
- Rayon: Beylagan
- Time zone: UTC+4 (AZT)
  - Summer (DST): UTC+5 (AZT)

Qaralar is a village in the Beylagan Rayon of Azerbaijan.
