= Məmmədli, Kurdamir =

Məmmədli
- Location within Azerbaijan
- Coordinates: 40°05′59″N 47°57′27″E
- Country: Azerbaijan
- Rayon: Kurdamir
- Time zone: UTC+4 (AZT)
  - Summer (DST): UTC+5 (AZT)

Məmmədli (also, Mamedli) is a village in the Kurdamir Rayon of Azerbaijan.
