= Chakhmakhly =

- Location within Azerbaijan
- Coordinates: 41°01′10″N 45°15′07″E
- Country: Azerbaijan
- District: Qazax
- Time zone: UTC+4 ( )
  - Summer (DST): UTC+5 ( )

Chakhmakhly is a town in the Qazax District of Azerbaijan.

== See also ==
- Qazakh District
