= Hacırüstəmli =

- Location within Azerbaijan
- Coordinates: 39°40′43″N 48°08′38″E
- Country: Azerbaijan
- Rayon: Imishli

Population
  - Total: 1,159
- Time zone: UTC+4 (AZT)
  - Summer (DST): UTC+5 (AZT)

Hacırüstəmli (known as Frunze and Suvorovka until 1999) is a village and municipality in the Imishli Rayon of Azerbaijan. It has a population of 1,159.
