= Qaralar, Saatly =

Village in Saatly District, Azerbaijan

Qaralar is a village and municipality in the Saatly Rayon of Azerbaijan. It has a population of 867.
