= Qaraqaşlı, Imishli =

Qaraqaşlı
- Municipality
- Location within Azerbaijan
- Coordinates: 39°52′42″N 48°13′23″E
- Country: Azerbaijan
- Rayon: Imishli

Population
  - Total: 1,298
- Time zone: UTC+4 (AZT)
  - Summer (DST): UTC+5 (AZT)

Qaraqaşlı (also, Karakashly) is a village and municipality in the Imishli Rayon of Azerbaijan. It has a population of 1,298.
