= Çaxmaq-Bina =

- Village
- Location within Azerbaijan Location within East Zangezur Economic Region
- Coordinates: 40°01′27″N 45°57′23″E
- Country: Azerbaijan
- District: Kalbajar
- Time zone: UTC+4 (AZT)
  - Summer (DST): UTC+5 (AZT)

Çaxmaq-Bina (Chakhmag-Bina) was a village in the Kalbajar District of Azerbaijan.

This village came under the occupation of the self-proclaimed Nagorno-Karabakh Republic during the First Nagorno-Karabakh War. It was returned to Azerbaijan on 25 October 2020 per the 2020 Nagorno-Karabakh ceasefire agreement.
