= Məmmədli, Barda =

Məmmədli
- Municipality
- Location within Azerbaijan Location within Karabakh Economic Region
- Coordinates: 40°17′01″N 47°24′56″E
- Country: Azerbaijan
- Rayon: Barda

Population
  - Total: 1,284
- Time zone: UTC+4 (AZT)
  - Summer (DST): UTC+5 (AZT)

Məmmədli is a village and municipality in the Barda Rayon of Azerbaijan. It has a population of 1,284.
