= Haçıalmuradlı =

- Municipality
- Location within Azerbaijan
- Coordinates: 39°46′10″N 48°12′55″E
- Country: Azerbaijan
- Rayon: Imishli

Population
  - Total: 1,232
- Time zone: UTC+4 (AZT)
  - Summer (DST): UTC+5 (AZT)

Haçıalmuradlı (also, Hajial-Muradli, Hajiali-Muradli, and Hadjialmuradli) is a village and municipality in the Imishli Rayon of Azerbaijan. It has a population of 1,232.
