= Xubyarlı, Imishli =

Xubyarlı
- Municipality
- Location within Azerbaijan
- Coordinates: 39°46′35″N 48°01′36″E
- Country: Azerbaijan
- Rayon: Imishli

Population
  - Total: 1,082
- Time zone: UTC+4 (AZT)
  - Summer (DST): UTC+5 (AZT)

Xubyarlı (also, Khubyarly and Khub”yarly) is a village and municipality in the Imishli Rayon of Azerbaijan. It has a population of 1,082.
