= Sarxanlı =

- Municipality
- Location within Azerbaijan
- Coordinates: 39°18′22″N 48°15′35″E
- Country: Azerbaijan
- Rayon: Jalilabad

Population
  - Total: 1,075
- Time zone: UTC+4 (AZT)
  - Summer (DST): UTC+5 (AZT)

Sarxanlı (also, Sarkhanly) is a village and municipality in the Jalilabad Rayon of Azerbaijan. It has a population of 1,075.
