= Ağaməmmədli, Imishli =

Ağaməmmədli
- Municipality
- Location within Azerbaijan
- Coordinates: 39°57′33″N 47°59′17″E
- Country: Azerbaijan
- Rayon: Imishli

Population
  - Total: 1,060
- Time zone: UTC+4 (AZT)
  - Summer (DST): UTC+5 (AZT)

Ağaməmmədli is a village and municipality in the Imishli Rayon of Azerbaijan. It has a population of 1,060.
