= Əliqulular =

- Municipality
- Location within Azerbaijan
- Coordinates: 39°54′31″N 47°55′41″E
- Country: Azerbaijan
- Rayon: Imishli

Population
  - Total: 2,197
- Time zone: UTC+4 (AZT)
  - Summer (DST): UTC+5 (AZT)

Əliqulular (also, Əliqullar, Alikular, and Alikulular) is a village and municipality in the Imishli Rayon of Azerbaijan. It has a population of 2,197.
