= Bəcirəvan, Barda =

Bəcirəvan
- Municipality
- Location within Azerbaijan Location within Karabakh Economic Region
- Coordinates: 40°12′45″N 47°12′50″E
- Country: Azerbaijan
- Rayon: Barda

Population
  - Total: 1,356
- Time zone: UTC+4 (AZT)
  - Summer (DST): UTC+5 (AZT)

Bəcirəvan (also, Badzhiravan and Badzhirovan) is a village and municipality in the Barda Rayon of Azerbaijan. It has a population of 1,356.
