= Məmmədli, Imishli =

Məmmədli
- Municipality
- Location within Azerbaijan
- Coordinates: 40°05′27″N 47°59′37″E
- Country: Azerbaijan
- Rayon: Imishli

Population
  - Total: 873
- Time zone: UTC+4 (AZT)
  - Summer (DST): UTC+5 (AZT)

Məmmədli is a village and municipality in the Imishli Rayon of Azerbaijan. It has a population of 873.
