= Qaralılar, Beylagan =

Qaralılar
- Location within Azerbaijan
- Coordinates: 39°46′N 47°54′E
- Country: Azerbaijan
- Rayon: Beylagan

Population
  - Total: 870
- Time zone: UTC+4 (AZT)
  - Summer (DST): UTC+5 (AZT)

Qaralılar (known as İkinci İmamverdili until 1991) is a village and municipality in the Beylagan Rayon of Azerbaijan. It has a population of 870.
