= Agamamedli, Saatly =

Agamamedli
- Location within Azerbaijan
- Coordinates: 39°52′04″N 48°54′29″E
- Country: Azerbaijan
- Rayon: Saatly
- Time zone: UTC+4 (AZT)
  - Summer (DST): UTC+5 (AZT)

Agamamedli (also, Aga-Mamedly) is a village in the Saatly Rayon of Azerbaijan.
