= Yuxarı Qaralar =

- Municipality
- Location within Azerbaijan
- Coordinates: 39°49′44″N 48°04′53″E
- Country: Azerbaijan
- Rayon: Imishli

Population
  - Total: 1,172
- Time zone: UTC+4 (AZT)

Yuxarı Qaralar (also, Qaralar, Verkhniy Karalar, and Karalar) is a village and municipality in the Imishli Rayon of Azerbaijan. It has a population of 1,172.
