= Qızılkənd =

Gizilkend Qızılkənd
- Municipality
- Gizilkend
- Location within Azerbaijan
- Coordinates: 39°43′12″N 48°04′48″E
- Country: Azerbaijan
- Rayon: Imishli

Population
  - Total: 6,136
- Time zone: UTC+4 (AZT)
  - Summer (DST): UTC+5 (AZT)

Gizilkend (Azerbaijani: Qızılkənd), also known as Kizilkend or Kyzylkend, and formerly Semënovka, is a village and municipality in the Imishli Rayon of Azerbaijan. It has a population of about 5000.

== The etymology of the name ==
The name of Gizilkend is directly related to the name of the early medieval fortress-settlement Giziltepe located in the territory of the settlement. The village of Gizilkend existed at the foot of the hill until the late 1930s, but was later deported to Kazakhstan by the vast majority of the population. They moved to the village of Semyonovka . In the first years of Azerbaijan's independence after the collapse of the USSR, on February 7, 1991, the historical name of the village was restored by a relevant decision.

== History ==
Today's Gizilkend was built during the Russian Empire, about 2 km from the old Gizilkend. The present location of the village was the pasture and harvest area of the old Gizilkend population. The purpose of the Russian settlement in the village was the complete severance of ties with the Turks of South Azerbaijan and the policy of Russification of the territories. The resettlement of Russians in these areas dates back to the late 19th and early 20th centuries. During the Second World War, the villagers were deported to the steppes of Kazakhstan, far from their native lands, due to the threat of unification of North and South Azerbaijan during the war. However, in the 60s and in the first years of our independence, the exiled residents returned to their native lands. On February 7, 1991, Semyonovka village was renamed Gizilkend and Semyonovka village council was renamed Gizilkend village council.It is one of the ancient settlements. Numerous medieval artifacts (swords, pottery, jewelry) were found around the village. There are opinions that the places called Giziltepe, Goytepe and Yeddi Tepe are ancient settlements.

== Geography and climate ==
Summers are hot, winters are mild. The number of antropogen springs in the village is about 20, and the water is very clean, pure and safe to drink. From these springs they meet the needs of the village for domestic and inland water.

== Population ==
The population is about 5,000 people. The population consists entirely of the oldest inhabitants of Azerbaijan and the Caucasus in general - (95%) Tarakamas from the nomadic tribes of the Caspian Turks, and partly from the Talysh who came here from the Lerik and Astara regions during World War II.

== Economy ==
The main economic activity of the population is agriculture. The passage of the Araz River through the area until the end of the 19th century and the fact that it is covered with Tugay forests as a coastal area are the main factors of soil fertility today. In agriculture, preference is given to technical crops - cotton. However, wheat, barley, alfalfa and sugar beet are also widely cultivated. During the USSR, there were vineyards in the village, and the area was suitable for irrigation and the fertility of the soil stimulated the great development of vineyards. At that time, viticulture brought great fame to the village. The cattle breeding farm has developed sufficiently. Beekeeping has been a rapidly growing economy since the late 1990s. Interest and attention to this area has been growing in recent years.
