= Karalar, Ararat =

Village in Ararat, Armenia

Karalar
- Location within Armenia Location within Ararat
- Coordinates: 39°53′56″N 44°38′54″E
- Country: Armenia
- Marz (Province): Ararat
- Time zone: UTC+4 ( )
  - Summer (DST): UTC+5 ( )

Karalar is a village in the Ararat Province of Armenia.

== See also ==
- Ararat Province
