= Oruclu, Imishli =

Oruclu
- Municipality
- Location within Azerbaijan
- Coordinates: 39°56′21″N 48°01′35″E
- Country: Azerbaijan
- Rayon: Imishli

Population
  - Total: 1,520
- Time zone: UTC+4 (AZT)
  - Summer (DST): UTC+5 (AZT)

Oruclu is a village and municipality in the Imishli Rayon of Azerbaijan. It has a population of 1,520.
