= Qaradonlu =

Garadonlu
- Municipality
- Azerbaijani: Qaradonlu
- Location within Azerbaijan
- Coordinates: 39°47′29″N 48°02′34″E
- Country: Azerbaijan
- District: Imishli

Population
  - Total: 1,185
- Time zone: UTC+4 (AZT)

Qaradonlu (Garadonlu) is a village and municipality in the Imishli District of Azerbaijan. It has a population of 1,185.

== Notable natives ==
- Sayyad Aran, Azerbaijani socio-figure; one of the founders of New Azerbaijan Party (NAP); First deputy chairman of the State Committee on Religious Associations of the Republic of Azerbaijan since 16 November 2012.
