= Xəlfəli, Imishli =

Xəlfəli
- Municipality
- Location within Azerbaijan
- Coordinates: 39°47′24″N 48°13′13″E
- Country: Azerbaijan
- Rayon: Imishli

Population
  - Total: 7,256
- Time zone: UTC+4 (AZT)
  - Summer (DST): UTC+5 (AZT)

Xəlfəli (also, Khalfali) is a village and municipality in the Imishli Rayon of Azerbaijan. It has a population of 7,256.
