= Qaralar-e Hajjqasem =

Qaralar-e Hajjqasem قرالرحاج قاسم
- Village
- Location within Iran
- Coordinates: 37°26′32″N 45°11′43″E
- Country: Iran
- Province: West Azerbaijan
- County: Urmia
- Bakhsh: Central
- Rural District: Torkaman

Population (2006)
  - Total: 186
- Time zone: UTC+3:30 (IRST)
  - Summer (DST): UTC+4:30 (IRDT)

Qaralar-e Hajjqasem (Persian: قرالرحاج قاسم, also Romanized as Qarālar-e Ḩājjqāsem; also known as Qarahlar-e Ḩājj Taqī) is a village in Torkaman Rural District, in the Central District of Urmia County, West Azerbaijan Province, Iran. At the 2006 census, its population was 186, in 48 families.
