= Mürsəl =

- Municipality
- Location within Azerbaijan
- Coordinates: 40°38′01″N 47°22′51″E
- Country: Azerbaijan
- Rayon: Agdash

Population
  - Total: 1,322
- Time zone: UTC+4 (AZT)
  - Summer (DST): UTC+5 (AZT)

Mürsəl is a village and municipality in the Agdash Rayon of Azerbaijan. It has a population of 1,322.
