= Qaralar-e Kuh =

Qaralar-e Kuh قرالركوه
- Village
- Location within Iran
- Coordinates: 37°26′01″N 45°08′43″E
- Country: Iran
- Province: West Azerbaijan
- County: Urmia
- Bakhsh: Central
- Rural District: Baranduzchay-ye Shomali

Population (2006)
  - Total: 226
- Time zone: UTC+3:30 (IRST)
  - Summer (DST): UTC+4:30 (IRDT)

Qaralar-e Kuh (Persian: قرالركوه, also Romanized as Qarālar-e Kūh; also known as Qarahlar-e Gūrkhāneh) is a village in Baranduzchay-ye Shomali Rural District, in the Central District of Urmia County, West Azerbaijan Province, Iran. At the 2006 census, its population was 226, in 64 families.
