= Qaralar, Imishli =

Qaralar
- Municipality
- Location within Azerbaijan
- Coordinates: 39°53′18″N 48°07′19″E
- Country: Azerbaijan
- Rayon: Imishli

Population
  - Total: 6,644
- Time zone: UTC+4 (AZT)
  - Summer (DST): UTC+5 (AZT)

Qaralar (also, Karalar) is a village and municipality in the Imishli Rayon of Azerbaijan. It has a population of 6,644.
