= Murğuzallı =

- Municipality
- Location within Azerbaijan
- Coordinates: 39°51′07″N 48°09′03″E
- Country: Azerbaijan
- Rayon: Imishli

Population
  - Total: 611
- Time zone: UTC+4 (AZT)
  - Summer (DST): UTC+5 (AZT)

Murğuzallı (also, Murğuzalılı, Murquzalılı, Murguzali, Murguzally, Murguzalyly, and Mursal) is a village and municipality in the Imishli Rayon of Azerbaijan. It has a population of 611.
