= Xoşçobanlı, Imishli =

Xoşçobanlı
- Municipality
- Location within Azerbaijan
- Coordinates: 39°51′12″N 48°07′25″E
- Country: Azerbaijan
- Rayon: Imishli

Population
  - Total: 1,281
- Time zone: UTC+4 (AZT)
  - Summer (DST): UTC+5 (AZT)

Xoşçobanlı (also, Xoşçobanli, Khosh-Chabanly, Khoshchobanly, and Khoshdzhabanly) is a village and municipality in the Imishli Rayon of Azerbaijan. It has a population of 1,281.
