= Qaralar, Shamkir =

Qaralar
- Municipality
- Location within Azerbaijan
- Coordinates: 40°52′00″N 46°16′11″E
- Country: Azerbaijan
- Rayon: Shamkir

Population
  - Total: 536
- Time zone: UTC+4 (AZT)
  - Summer (DST): UTC+5 (AZT)

Qaralar (also, Karalylar) is a village and municipality in the Shamkir Rayon of Azerbaijan. It has a population of 536.

== Notable natives ==
- Zaur Sariyev — National Hero of Azerbaijan.
