= Qaralar-e Tasuji =

Village in West Azerbaijan province, Iran

Qaralar-e Tasuji Persian: قرالر طسوجي
- Village
- Location within Iran
- Coordinates: 37°40′57″N 44°58′05″E
- Country: Iran
- Province: West Azerbaijan
- County: Urmia
- District: Nazlu
- Rural District: Nazluchay

Population (2016)
  - Total: 2,844
- Time zone: UTC+3:30 (IRST)

Qaralar-e Tasuji (Persian: قرالر طسوجي) (Note: Also romanized as Qarālar-e Ţasūjī; also known as Qarehlar) is a village in Nazluchay Rural District of Nazlu District in Urmia County, West Azerbaijan province, Iran.

== Demographics ==
=== Population ===
At the time of the 2006 National Census, the village's population was 2,279 in 428 households. The following census in 2011 counted 2,580 people in 591 households. The 2016 census measured the population of the village as 2,844 people in 686 households. It was the most populous village in its rural district.
