= Xoşçobanlı, Masally =

Xoşçobanlı
- Municipality
- Location within Azerbaijan
- Coordinates: 39°08′18″N 48°42′23″E
- Country: Azerbaijan
- Rayon: Masally

Population
  - Total: 1,285
- Time zone: UTC+4 (AZT)
  - Summer (DST): UTC+5 (AZT)

Xoşçobanlı (also, Khoshchobanly and Khoshchobanny) is a village and municipality in the Masally District of Azerbaijan. It has a population of 1,285.
