= Imishli District =

District in central Azerbaijan

Coordinates: 39.8692°N 48.060°E

- District
- Map of Azerbaijan showing Imishli District
- Country: Azerbaijan
- Region: Mil-Mughan
- Established: 8 August 1930
- Capital: Imishli
- Settlements: 51

Government
  - Governor: Elchin Rzayev

Area
  - Total: 1,890 km^{2} (730 sq mi)

Population (2020)
  - Total: 158,682
  - Density: 84.0/km^{2} (217/sq mi)
- Time zone: UTC+4 (AZT)
- Postal code: 3000
- Website: imishli-ih.gov.az

Imishli District (Azerbaijani: İmişli rayonu) is one of the 66 districts of Azerbaijan. It is located in the centre of the country and belongs to the Central Aran Economic Region. The district borders the districts of Beylagan, Zardab, Kurdamir, Sabirabad, Saatly, Bilasuvar, and the Ardabil Province of Iran. Its capital and largest city is Imishli. As of 2020, the district had a population of 158,682.

== Geography ==
The district is mostly lowlands and its territory is below sea level. The Kura river forms the northern border of the district, while Aras river forms part of the southern border and flows through the centre of the district. Grey and partly grey soils are spread in the district. The district has several natural mineral resources such as oil and gas and sand-gravel.

The climate is mostly mild warm and dry desert. The average temperature is around 1.60C in January and 26.10C in July. Annual precipitation is 300 mm. The main vegetation is a semi-desert type of wormwood and saline. The forest area consists of poplars, cypresses, mulberries, ordinary pomegranates, horses, hips, and woods. The area has a diverse flora. There are wild boars, wolves, common foxes, grey rabbits and gazelles. Small mammals mostly represented by gums. From the birds, the pheasant, the larvae, is more than a hawk, adornment, and dove.

Azerbaijan's largest natural lake, Sarysu, is located mostly in the Imishli District, with a small part of it falling onto the neighbouring Sabirabad District.

== Education and culture ==
The Public Education Department of Imishli District started its work in January 1942. In January 1989, it was renamed the Department of Public Education of the district, and from October 1993 - District Education Department. At present, the Imishli District Education Department has 62 general education schools, including 57 full-time, 3 general secondary, 2 primary schools and 2 out-of-school establishments.

=== Media ===
The "Xalq sozu" newspaper, which has been published since 1990, has been headed by Baloghlan Ganbarli, Boyukagha Huseynov, Mutallim Huseynov, Azay Hashimov, Mammad Gasimov, Hidayat Kazimov, Jafar Garayev, Shukur Seyfullayev and Murad Farzaliyev. Currently, the newspaper's head is Samed Ismayilov.

The name of the newspaper	Published date
"Qaradonlu kolxozçusu"	1932
"İmişli kolxozçusu"	1938–1962
"Yüksəliş"	1962–1966
"Qızıl Ulduz"	1966–1990
"Xalq sözü"	1990

=== Historical monuments ===
- The Khurshurt dwellings coincide with the Bronze Age. It is located on the right side of Baku-Beylegan road, 1.2 km from the village of Nurulu.
- The settlement of Gyzyltepe coincides with the Bronze Age. It is located 4 km north-east of the village of Gyzylkend.
- The Yedditepe mound belongs to the last Bronze Age and the Iron Age. It is located in the west of the village of Gyzylkend.
- Garatapé is the first Bronze Age settlement, located 17 km north–south of the Bajiravan village of the region.
- The Abyktepe settlement dates back to the Bronze Age. It is located 3 km north of Aranly village.
- The remains of Galacha belong to the 12th-13th centuries. It is located 17 km from Bahramtapa-Bilasuvar highway.

== Infrastructure ==
- Imishli Sugar Factory was built by the Azersun Holding Group of Companies and was put into operation on 23 March 2006. President Ilham Aliyev attended the opening of the plant. The plant produces sugar powder, with a daily production capacity of 1,000 tonnes. The enterprise employs 850 people, the average monthly salary is 430 manats.
- Plant Lubricants Plant of Azerbaijan Sugar Production Association Plant Oil Plant was put into operation in 2009 and the daily production capacity is 200 tons.
- Combined feed mill of Azerbaijan Sugar Production Union The mixed feed mill was put into operation in 2009 and the daily production capacity is 600 tons.
- Araz was built at the expense of Canned Juices and Cognac Plant and started operating in 2003. The company employs 150 people, with a production capacity of 850 conventional banks.
- Imishli Broiler-Poultry Limited Liability Company was established on the basis of Imishli Broiler-Poultry farm, it was put into operation in 2003. It produces 5 tons of poultry per day. There are 210 employees.
- The Muradkhanli Enlarged Oil Mine started operating in 1970, with a daily production capacity of 85 tonnes. The number of employees is 160 people.
- Imishli Locomotive depot was commissioned in 1968 and the number of employees is 218.
- Bahramtapa Iron and Steel Plant is a local enterprise of "Melioration and Water Management" Open Joint-Stock Company producing iron and concrete products. Starting from 1986, the plant employs 51 people. The daily production capacity is 75 cubic meters.
- Imishli Iron and Steel Open Joint-Stock Company, the plant has been producing iron and concrete products since 1960. The factory employs 185 people. The daily production capacity is 85 cubic meters.
- "ORION-E" Limited Liability Company was established at the expense of the Limited Liability Company and started operating in 2003. The company employs 87 people, producing 75–80 tons of ascetics a day.
- 330-kV Imishli-Parsabad power transmission line, construction works at the power transmission line were carried out by Azerenergystroy LLC under the contract with the Samir company of the Islamic Republic of Iran. The launch of the strategic power transmission line will connect the energy systems of Azerbaijan and the Islamic Republic of Iran.
- Imishli-Garavalili-Mirili, the capital repair work was carried out on Imishli-Garavali-Mirili highway by order of President Ilham Aliyev of Azerbaijan dated October 21, 2010, No. 1163. The 12-kilometre-long motorway has been reconstructed in line with modern requirements, along with the road renovation and landscaping. This road, built on the world-class level, eliminated all obstacles that prevented the movement of trucks and passenger cars, and people's long-lasting dissatisfaction has been abandoned. The use of the road has also reduced the distance between the Imishli and Saatli districts twice.
- Railways, the length of automobile roads passing through Imishli region is 98 km. 7 km of these roads are of II category and 91 km are the III category. The length of local roads is 152 km. 111 km of this road is of IV category and 41 km is V category. The length of the railways passing through the district is the only 80 km. In addition, 35 km of the main road, 20 km of the road, and 25 km are the narrow roads.

== Court ==
Imishli District Court was established in 1938. The initial name of the Court was Garadonlu People's Court. On 8 August 1938, it was renamed Imishli District People's Court.

== Settlements ==
Populated places in Imishli Rayon
Number	Name of populated place	Distance in KM from Provincial Center	Population
1.	İmişli şəhəri	--	31,310
2.	Bəhrəmtəpə qəsəbəsi (formerly Bir May)	19	4,092
3.	Qızılkənd kəndi	29	3,321
4.	Aranlı kəndi	33	3,604
5.	Hacırüstəmli kəndi	36	1,148
6.	Məzrəli kəndi	13	3,311
7.	Xubyarlı kəndi	15	1,074
8.	Çaxırlı kəndi	18	1,537
9.	Qaradonlu kəndi	12	1,176
10.	Çahar kəndi	7	1,146
11.	Gövhərli kəndi	8	858
12.	Ölcələr kəndi	7	494
13.	Qaralar kəndi (Arazın sağ sahili)	8	1,171
14.	Soltanmuradlı kəndi	6	870
15.	Qaralar kəndi (Arazın sol sahili)	5	3,336
16.	Nurulu kəndi	9	770
17.	Muradallı kəndi	7	796
18.	Otuziki kəndi	4	1,390
19.	Xoşçobanlı kəndi	7	1,276
20.	Murğuzallar kəndi	10	611
21.	Mürsəlli kəndi	16	862
22.	Qaraqaşlı kəndi	17	1,303
23.	Qulubəyli kəndi	16	1,452
24.	Xəlfəli kəndi	23	2,218
25.	Kürdmahmudlu kəndi	22	1,107
26.	Hacalmuradlı kəndi	25	1,211
27.	Cavadxanlı kəndi	9	1,082
28.	Bəcrəvan kəndi	13	2,185
29.	Qaravəlli kəndi	13	936
30.	Ağcüyür kəndi	14	382
31.	Mirili kəndi	17	950
32.	Yalavac kəndi	3	2,876
33.	Rəsullu kəndi	5	1,357
34.	Məhəmmədli kəndi	7	575
35.	Göbəktala kəndi	8	1,386
36.	Şahverdili kəndi	11	1,315
37.	Boşçallar kəndi	21	1,570
38.	Sarxanlı kəndi	22	6,185
39.	Qaragüvəndikli kəndi	23	1,271
40.	Cəfərli kəndi	8	3,420
41.	Əliqulular kəndi	13	2,175
42.	Muradxanlı kəndi	14	2,821
43.	Oruclu kəndi	19	1,507
44.	Ağammədli kəndi	25	1,060
45.	Hacımustafalı kəndi	35	88
46.	Əliyetməzli kəndi	32	535
47.	Telişli kəndi	31	789
48.	Allahmədədli kəndi	34	375
49.	Məmmədli kəndi	34	868
50.	Ağamallar kəndi	48	544
