= Catholic Church in Iran =

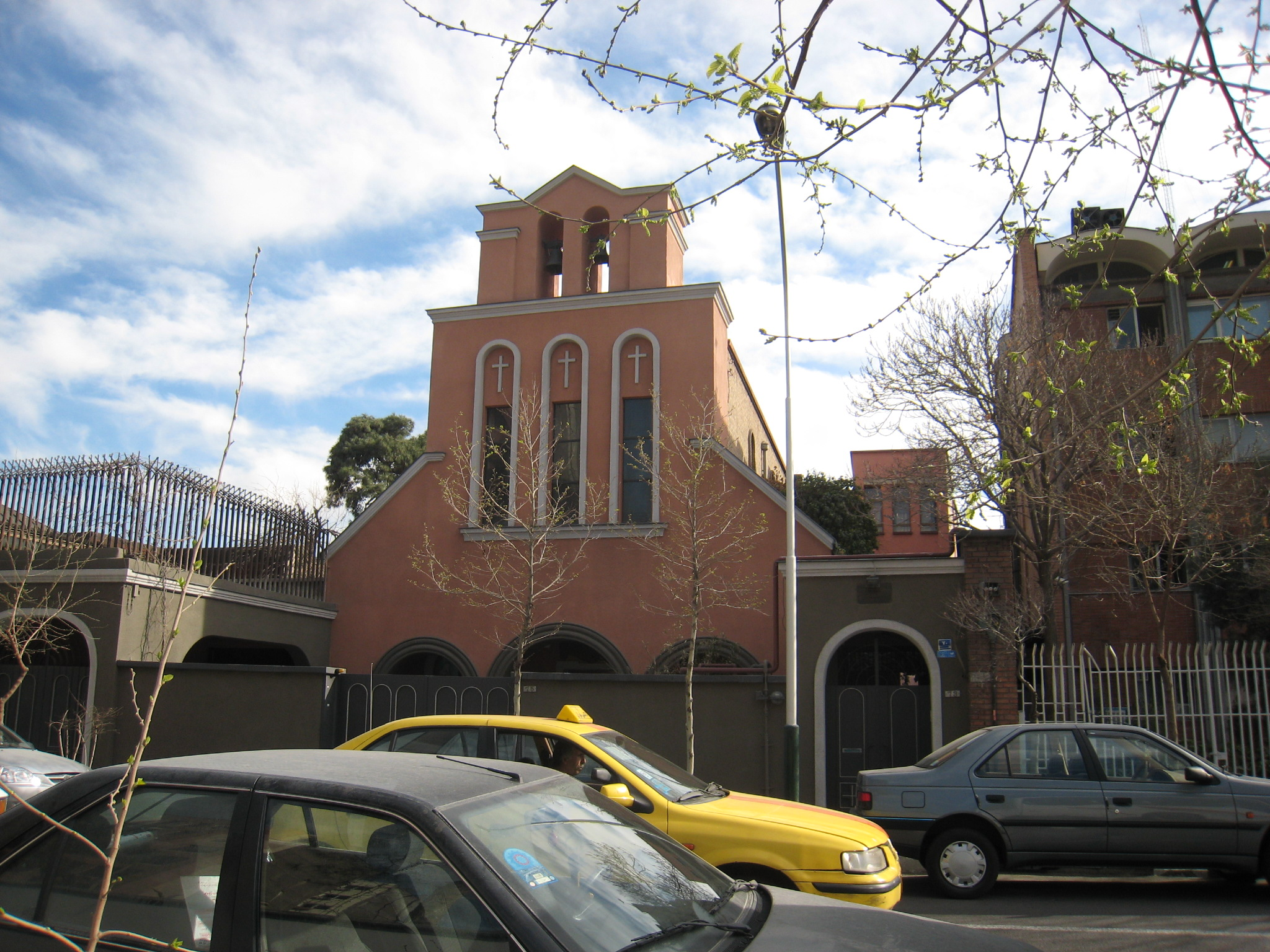
- Cathedral of the Consolata, Tehran
- Type: National polity
- Classification: Catholic Church
- Pope: Leo XIV
- Apostolic Nuncio: Andrzej Józwowicz
- Region: Iran
- Members: ca. 22,000

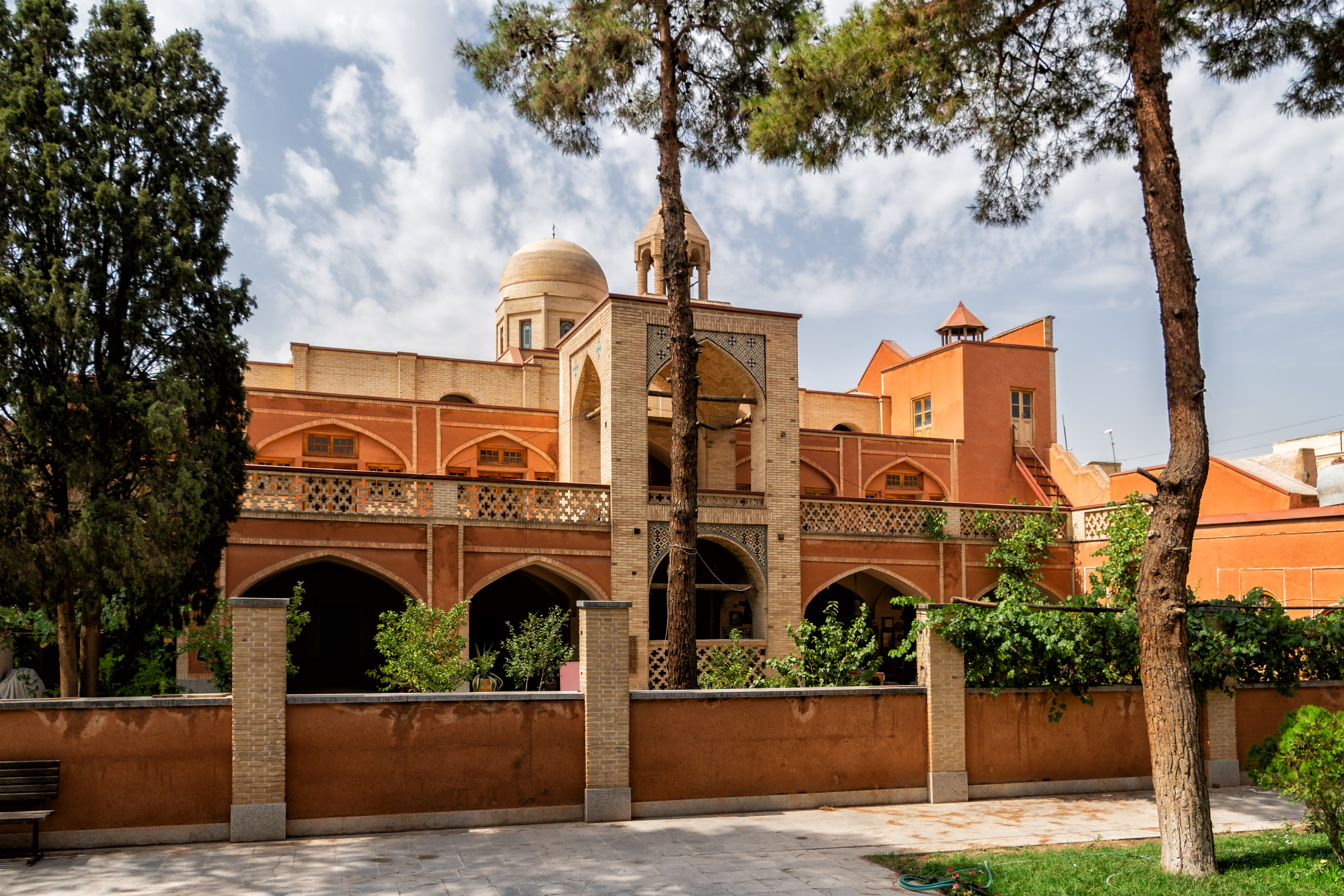
Church of Our Lady of the Rosary in New Julfa

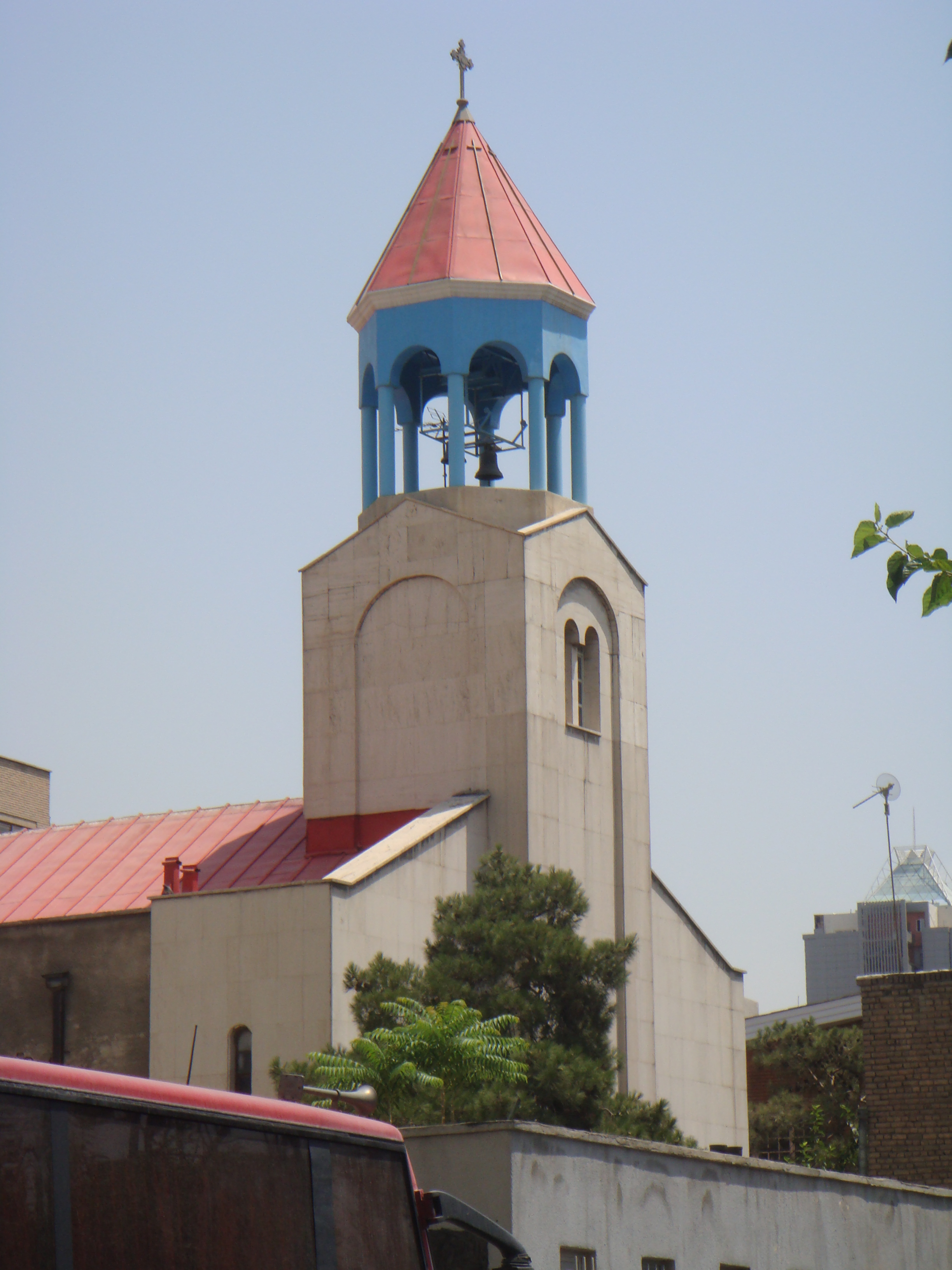
Armenian-Catholic church in Tehran (2011)

The Catholic Church in Iran is part of the worldwide Catholic Church, under the spiritual leadership of the Pope in Rome. Catholicism spread in the country through missionaries and the migration or resettlement of Eastern Catholic communities since the Middle Ages. The seventeenth century saw stronger missionary efforts by the Latin Church, but most of it ceased by the end of the eighteenth century and only from the mid-nineteenth century onwards did the Latin Church establish a new presence. Today, there are about 22,000 Catholics in Iran, most of which are Chaldean Catholic, but with also Armenian Catholic and Latin Catholic communities present.

== History ==
=== Middle Ages ===
The Catholic Church has a long history with the Persians. Since the late thirteenth century, Latin missionaries, primarily members of the Dominican and Franciscan orders, had worked in the north of Persia and the neighbouring vassal states of Armenia and Georgia. By about 1300, there were three centers in Tabriz, Dehikerkan and Maragheh, soon joined by a new post at Soltaniyeh (which 1313 had become the capital of Öljaitü). The missionary activity was first under the nominal administration of the archdiocese of Khanbalik, but in 1318 a papal bull established the archdiocese of Soltaniyeh, which lasted until 1355. The new archdiocese was to include all the Persian empire under the rule of the Mongols except for some territories. Of its six suffragans, only three were appointed in its territory and consisted of the three old centers (Tabriz, Dehikerkan and Maragheh). The missionary work was increasingly focused on Armenians and Georgians and by 1328, only the bishop of Maragheh, the famous Bartholomew of Bologna, was still in Persia. Thereafter, only few monks remained behind but the anarchy after the death of the last member of the Ilkhanate and the Black Death killed all missionaries.

=== Early Modern period ===
After that, it took to the sixteenth century until Catholicism returned to the country when a group of Augustinian hermits established themselves on Hormuz Island which had been captured by the Portuguese in 1507. In 1582, the leader of the Augustinians, Simon Morales, journey to Isfahan, the capital of the Safavid dynasty which then ruled Iran, and established there a mission in 1602. In July 1604, a group of Discalced Carmelites set off from the Vatican via Russia to Persia to launch a new mission and arrived in Isfahan in 1607. Here, they translated the mass service into Persian, opened schools for the Christians of Isfahan and became one of the most devoted and persevering Christian missionaries for the next 150 years. Around the same time, the Chaldean Church formally established itself in Persia when the Chaldean patriarchal sea was translated to monastery of St John close to Salmas.

Shah Abbas was in general open to the mission and had sympathy to some of the saintly missionaries, whose courage and persistency he admired and with some of whom he became friends. Additionally to the Augustines, several other religious orders, including the Benedictines, Carmelites, Capuchins and Jesuits were also allowed to set up monasteries and missions in Isfahan. A diocese was established in Isfahan in 1629 that lasted until 1708 and a cathedral was built in 1640 by Father Bernard de Sainte Therese. He granted the Augustinians concessions to work among the minorities of the Safavid empire, though he forbade them to convert Muslims. Though the missionaries were seldom harassed, their success in the spiritual realm was limited due to the Shah's express commands. Specifically, Abbas I issued an edict shortly before his death in 1629 that allowed all Christians who converted to Islam to claim property of their relation for up to seven (later four) generations; this resulted in over 50,000 Christians converting in order to not lose their property. Overall, both Abbas and European governments were interested in the missionaries' role as intermediaries in order to establish profitable commercial and diplomatic relations. Though the missionaries disliked being forced into a more diplomatic than spiritual role, they were pioneers that helped Iran learn more about the West and establish meaningful relationships between Persia and the European states.

Under Abbas' successors, the missionaries were allowed to continue their work, but they continued to have limited success. On one-hand, the interest and curiosity, with which they had been greeted during the times of Abbas I, had diminished and on the other their role as intermediary was less sought after more stable relations between the Ottomans and Safavids begun. Though the missionaries and other foreign Christians were mostly treated well, conditions for Christian Persians worsened. Between 1656 and 1658, attempts were made to convert all non-Muslim Persians by force and during the reigns of Shah Suleiman (1666–1692) and Shah Sultan Husayn (1692–1722) more discriminatory laws were passed. The missionary work continued still for some time and in 1672, the Capuchins came to Tabriz. Eventually, the European support for the missions was lost and most religious orders had to leave the country by the end of the eighteenth century. A church the Dominicans built in 1695 in Isfahan still stands to this day.

The missionary effort was revived from 1838 onwards by the efforts of a French layman, Eugène Boré. Aided by the French Ambassador to Persia, Boré was able to convince the Shah to issue a firman to that Catholics should have the freedom of conscience, could operate schools, contract marriages among themselves and carry on trade. Soon after, Boré convinced the Lazarists to aid his endeavour and the first arrived in Persia in 1840. The diocese of Isfahan was re-established in 1850 and followed by that of Teheran in 1853 and the diocese of Urmia in 1892 (which had an archbishop from 1910 to 1918). The Qajar dynasty did not interfere with these mostly French missionaries as they intended to court French favour as an alternative to English and Russian interest in the country and allowed them to build churches and to open two colleges, a hospital and an orphanage that were open also to Muslims. In 1872, the Apostolic Delegation for Persia was created and the first delegate was the Lazarist Cluzel, who was respected by the Shah (who made him a member of the Order of the Lion and the Sun) and who engaged in the building of a cathedral in Urmia and numerous chapels in the surrounding villages.

The Little Brothers and Sisters of Jesus established leprosaria in Tabriz and Mashad in the early twentieth century. Around the end of 1933, the two Dominicans founded a house in Shiraz, translated prayers into Persian and studied especially Persian Sufism (the book "The Persian Sufis" by Cyprian Rice, O.P., was a result of his lifelong friendship with a Ni'matullāhī Sufi). Though they had to leave after eight month, a new, more permanent house was established in 1962 when the papal nuncio in Iran invited fathers from Ireland to come and work in Iran. In 1934, the Salesians were given charge of all Catholics in Khuzestan province, with the first four Salesian fathers coming in 1937, taking especially care of the spiritual care of Italian immigrants who were numerous at the time.

=== Modern period ===
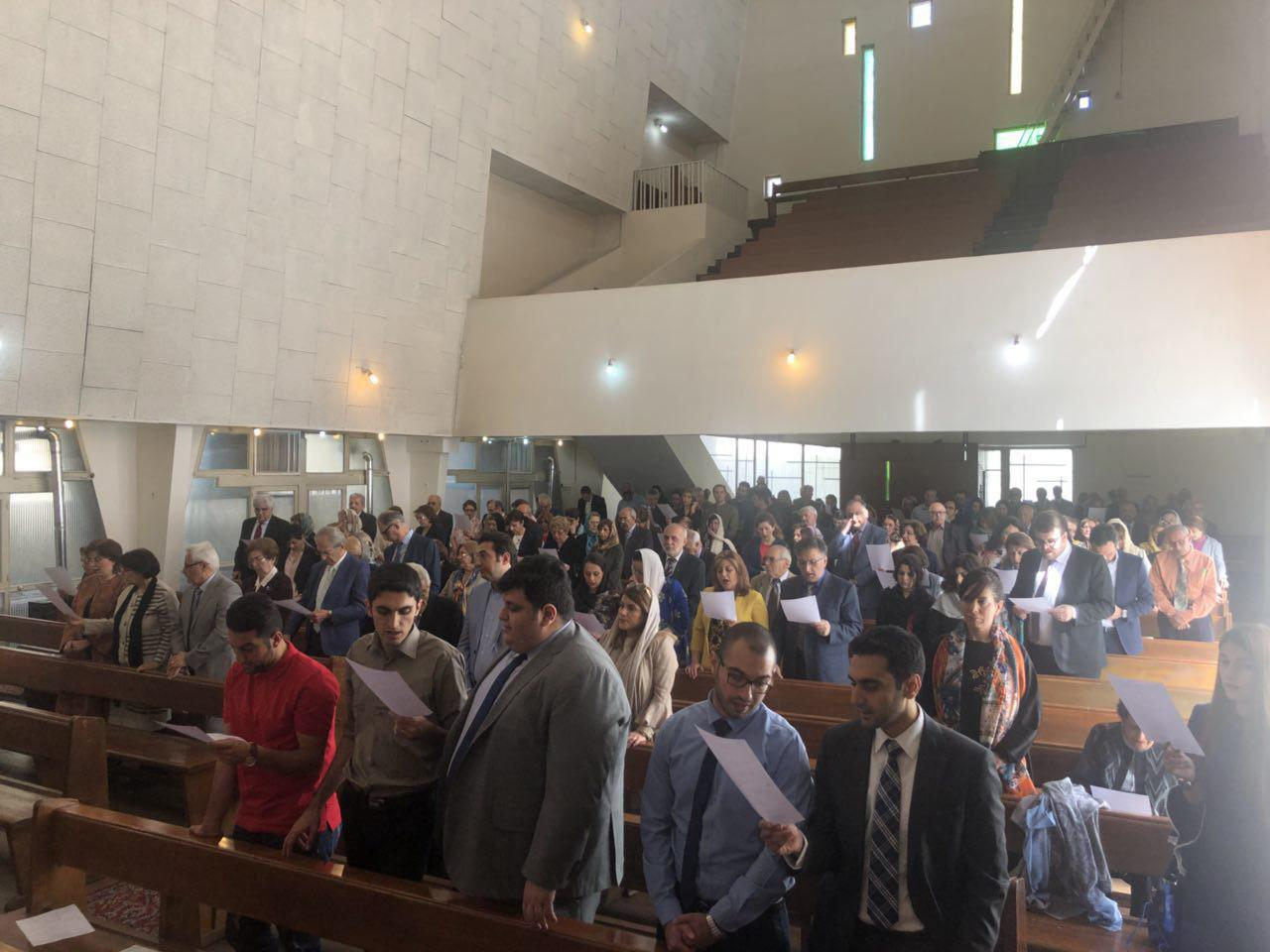
Saint Mary's Assyrian Chaldean Catholic Church in Urmia, Iran

The Catholic presence in Iran encouraged the Vatican to maintain diplomatic links even after the 1979 Iranian Islamic revolution. Upon Khomenei's seizure of power, Pope John Paul II dispatched Melkite Bishop Hilarion Capucci to serve as an intermediary and to protect the human rights and needs of Armenian Catholics within Iran, who faced increasing discrimination. According to the Iranian constitution of 1989, religious minorities such as Catholics are free to worship "with respect for the laws inspired by Muslim faith" and have the right to have representatives in parliament. Compared to Turkey, Christians are allowed to wear religious habits and pectoral crosses in public.

In October 2010, an Iranian official delivered a letter from President Mahmoud Ahmadinejad to Pope Benedict XVI in which the President said he hoped to work closely with the Holy See to help stem religious intolerance, the breakup of families and the increase of secularism and materialism. A return letter from Pope Benedict was hand-delivered by Jean-Louis Cardinal Tauran, president of the Pontifical Council for Interreligious Dialogue, according to Passionist Father Reverend Ciro Benedettini, vice-director of the Vatican Press Office in a statement issued November 10, 2010. The papal letter's contents were not disclosed. Cardinal Tauran met with the Iranian leader while Tauran was participating in a three-day meeting on Islamic-Christian relations, along with Iranian Catholic leaders. The meeting was a joint initiative of the Pontifical Council for Interreligious Dialogue and the Teheran-based Islamic Culture and Relations Organization. In the following year, the first international monastic/Shia Muslim dialogue was organised by the DIMMID in Sant’Anselmo, attended among others by Iranian scholar Mohammad Ali Shomali; further meetings took place in Qom/Isfahan (2012), Assisi/Rome (2014), Qom/Mashad (2016) and Karen, Nairobi (2017).

In 2022, there were about 21,380 Catholics in Iran out of a total population of about 86.8 million. Around 2,000 are Latin-rite Catholics, the others being part of the Armenian Catholic Church and Chaldean Catholic Church. Aside from some Iranian citizens, Catholics include foreigners in Iran like Spanish-speaking people (Latin Americans and Spanish), and other Europeans. Cardinal Dominique Mathieu was in 2025 the first Archbishop of Tehran–Isfahan to participate in a papal conclave.

== Dioceses and Eparchies ==
- Chaldean Catholic Archeparchy of Ahvaz
- Chaldean Catholic Archdiocese of Tehran
- Chaldean Catholic Archeparchy of Urmyā
  - Chaldean Catholic Eparchy of Salmas
- Armenian Catholic Eparchy of Isfahan
- Latin Catholic Archdiocese of Tehran-Isfahan

== Cathedrals ==
See also List of Catholic churches in Tehran and List of Catholic dioceses in Iran

- Cathedral of the Consolata in Tehran, Iran (Roman Catholic Archdiocese of Isfahan)
- Cathedral of St. Joseph in Tehran, Iran (Chaldean Catholic Metropolitan Archdiocese of Tehran)
- Cathedral of St. Mary the Mother of God in Urmia, Iran (Chaldean Catholic Metropolitan Archdiocese of Urmyā)
- Church of St Yaghou in Salmas
- Surp Grigor Lusavorich Cathedral in Tehran
- Surp Mesrob Church in Ahvaz
- Cathedral of Our Lady of the Rosary in New Julfa, Iran (Roman Catholic Archdiocese of Isfahan)
- Cathedral of St. Lazarus (Roman Catholic Archdiocese of Isfahan)

== See also ==
- Religion in Iran
- Christianity in Iran
- Holy See-Iran relations
- List of Persian saints

== Bibliography ==
- Gorder, Christian A. Van (5 January 2010). Christianity in Persia and the Status of Non-Muslims in Modern Iran. Rowman & Littlefield. ISBN 978-0-7391-3611-9.
- Moreen, Vera B. (1981). "The Status of Religious Minorities in Safavid Iran 1617-61". Journal of Near Eastern Studies. 40 (2): 119–134. ISSN 0022-2968.
- Tamcke, Martin (1 June 2018). "Iran". In Lamport, Mark A. (ed.). Encyclopedia of Christianity in the Global South. Bloomsbury Publishing PLC. pp. 395–398. ISBN 978-1-4422-7157-9.
- Waterfield, Robin E. (2011). Christians in Persia: Assyrians, Armenians, Roman Catholics and Protestants. London: Routledge. ISBN 0042750016.
