= Imad Khoshaba Gargees =

Iraqi-born Chaldean Catholic archbishop (born 1978)

The Most Reverend Imad Khoshaba Gargees
- Archbishop of Tehran of the Chaldeans
- Church: Chaldean Catholic Church
- Appointed: 26 September 2023
- Predecessor: Ramzi Garmou

Orders
- Ordination: 8 June 2004
- Consecration: 10 November 2023 by Louis Raphaël I Sako

Personal details
- Born: 4 April 1978 (age 48) Komane, Duhok Governorate, Iraq
- Education: Pontifical Oriental Institute
- Motto: Virga tua et baculus tuus, ipsa me consolata sunt

Imad Khoshaba Gargees (born 4 April 1978) is an Iraqi-born Iranian hierarch of the Chaldean Catholic Church who has served as archbishop of Tehran of the Chaldeans since 2023. He also serves as patriarchal administrator of the Chaldean Catholic Archeparchy of Urmia and Chaldean Catholic Eparchy of Salmas in Iran since 2024.

== Early life and education ==
Gargees was born on 4 April 1978 in Komane in the Amedi District, in the Duhok Governorate of Iraqi Kurdistan. From 1997 to 2004 he studied philosophy and theology at the Babel College for Philosophy and Theology in Baghdad.

After completing his studies he continued his education in Rome at the Pontifical Oriental Institute, where he obtained a licentiate and doctorate in canon law.

== Priesthood ==
Gargees was ordained a priest on 8 June 2004 in his native village of Komane and was incardinated in the Chaldean Catholic Eparchy of Amadiya (since 2020 incardinated in the newly created Chaldean Catholic Eparchy of Duhok).

From 2004 to 2010 he served as secretary to the bishop of Duhok while also working as parish priest in Amadiyah. After completing his studies in Rome, he returned to Iraq and later served as protosyncellus of the eparchy and parish priest of the Mar Ith Alaha Cathedral in Duhok from 2016 to 2022.

In 2016 he was also appointed director of the Institute of Catechesis in Duhok. In 2022 he became parish priest in Mangesh.

== Episcopacy ==
On 26 September 2023 the Synod of Bishops of the Chaldean Catholic Church elected Gargees as archbishop of Tehran of the Chaldeans, and Pope Francis granted his assent to the election.

He received episcopal consecration on 10 November 2023 from Louis Raphaël I Sako, the Patriarch of Babylon of the Chaldeans. The consecration took place in the Mar Ith Alaha Cathedral in Duhok.

As archbishop, he leads the Chaldean Catholic community in Iran, a minority Christian population within a predominantly Muslim society.

In January 2024 he was also appointed patriarchal administrator of the Chaldean Catholic Archeparchy of Urmia and Chaldean Catholic Eparchy of Salmas in Iran.
