= List of Catholic dioceses in Iran =

The following is the List of the Catholic dioceses of Iran.

== List of dioceses ==
=== Armenian Catholic Church ===
- Ecclesiastical Province of Cilicia:
  - Eparchy of Ispahan

=== Chaldean Catholic Church ===
- Immediately Subject to the Patriarch:
  - Archeparchy of Ahwaz
- Ecclesiastical Province of Tehran:
  - Metropolitan Archeparchy of Tehran
- Ecclesiastical Province of Urmya:
  - Metropolitan Archeparchy of Urmia
    - Eparchy of Salmas

=== Latin Church ===
- Immediately subject to the Holy See:
  - Archdiocese of Teheran-Isfahan
