= Thomas Meram =

Iraqi-born Chaldean Catholic archbishop (born 1943)

Most Reverend Thomas Meram
- Archbishop Emeritus of Urmia
- Church: Chaldean Catholic Church
- Appointed: 30 November 1983
- Term ended: 6 January 2024
- Predecessor: Samuel Chauriz
- Other post: Bishop of Salmas (1983–2024)

Orders
- Ordination: 11 June 1967
- Consecration: 11 March 1984 by Youhannan Semaan Issayi

Personal details
- Born: Thomas Meram; 6 August 1943 (age 83) Tel Keppe, Kingdom of Iraq

Thomas Meram (born 6 August 1943) is an Iraqi-born Iranian Chaldean Catholic hierarch, who served as the Archbishop of Urmia and Bishop of Salmas in Iran from 1983 until his retirement in 2024.

== Biography ==
Thomas Meram was born in Tel Keppe, Iraq, on 6 August 1943. After completing his ecclesiastical studies, he was ordained a priest on 11 June 1967.

On 30 November 1983, following the death of Samuel Chauriz, he was appointed Archbishop of Urmia and Bishop of Salmas by the Synod of the Chaldean Church. His appointment was confirmed by Pope John Paul II. He received his episcopal consecration on 11 March 1984 from Archbishop Youhannan Semaan Issayi, assisted by Hanna Zora and Giovanni De Andrea.

As the leader of the Chaldean community in Urmia and Salmas, Meram navigated decades of political and social change in Iran, managing the spiritual welfare of the Christian minority in the northwestern region. He was a participant in the electoral Synod of Bishops of the Chaldean Catholic Church in January 2013, which elected the new Patriarch Louis Raphaël I Sako.

In 2014, amid the rise of ISIS in the region, Meram spoke out regarding the mass emigration of Christians from the Middle East. He warned that without international intervention and stability, the region risked becoming a "museum" of its Christian past rather than a living community. He noted that while the situation for Christians in Iran remained relatively stable compared to Iraq, the regional conflict created a significant psychological burden on the community.

In 2018, he participated in the ad limina visit of the Chaldean Catholic bishops to Pope Francis. Between 2021 and 2023, he also served as the Patriarchal Administrator of the Archeparchy of Tehran.

On 6 January 2024, it was announced his retirement from the pastoral governance of the Archeparchy of Urmia and the Eparchy of Salmas.
