= Sabri Anar =

Turkish Chaldean Catholic archbishop (1966–2026)

The Most Reverend Sabri Anar
- Archbishop of Diyarbakır (Amida)
- Church: Chaldean Catholic Church
- Diocese: Diyarbakır
- Appointed: 24 May 2023
- Installed: 16 July 2023
- Predecessor: Ramzi Garmou
- Successor: Sede vacante

Orders
- Ordination: 10 November 1990 by Youhannan Semaan Issayi
- Consecration: 16 July 2023 by Louis Raphaël I Sako

Personal details
- Born: 1 January 1966 Uludere, Turkey
- Died: 17 October 2026 (aged 60) Paris, France
- Denomination: Chaldean Catholic Church
- Residence: Istanbul, Turkey
- Education: Catholic University of Paris

Sabri Anar (1 January 1966 – 17 October 2026) was a Turkish Chaldean Catholic hierarch, who served as the Archbishop of the Archeparchy of Diyarbakır between 2023 and 2026. Prior to his episcopal appointment, he served for over thirty years in pastoral ministry in France.

== Early life and education ==
Sabri Anar was born on 1 January 1966 in the village of Uludere in the Şırnak Province of south-eastern Turkey. He entered the minor seminary in Istanbul in 1984 before moving to Baghdad, Iraq, to complete his philosophical and theological studies at the Patriarchal Seminary.

He later pursued advanced studies in France at the Catholic University of Paris, where he specialized in spiritual theology.

== Priesthood ==
Anar was ordained a priest on 10 November 1990. Following his ordination, he was assigned to pastoral work in France to serve the growing Chaldean diaspora. From 1990 until 2006, he was the pastor of the Chaldean community in Sarcelles. From 2006 until his episcopal appointment in 2023, he served as the rector of the Saint Thomas Apostle Chaldean Church in Sarcelles. During this period, he also held the position of Syncellus for the Chaldean faithful in France.

== Episcopate ==
On 24 May 2023, following his election by the Synod of Bishops of the Chaldean Church, Pope Francis gave his assent to Anar's appointment as the Archbishop of Diyarbakır.

Anar was consecrated on 16 July 2023 in Istanbul by Patriarch Louis Raphaël I Sako, with Archbishop Ramzi Garmou, Archbishop Marek Solczyński and Bishop Stanislas Lalanne serving as co-consecrators. His jurisdiction extended over the entire territory of Turkey, with the historic archeparchial see based in Diyarbakır and his administrative residence located in Istanbul.

== Death ==
Anar died in France on 17 October 2026, following an illness, according to an announcement by the Chaldean Patriarchate. He was 60.
