= Cathedral of the Consolata, Tehran =

Roman Catholic church in Tehran, Iran

Cathedral of the Consolata
- کلیسای جامع کنسولاتا
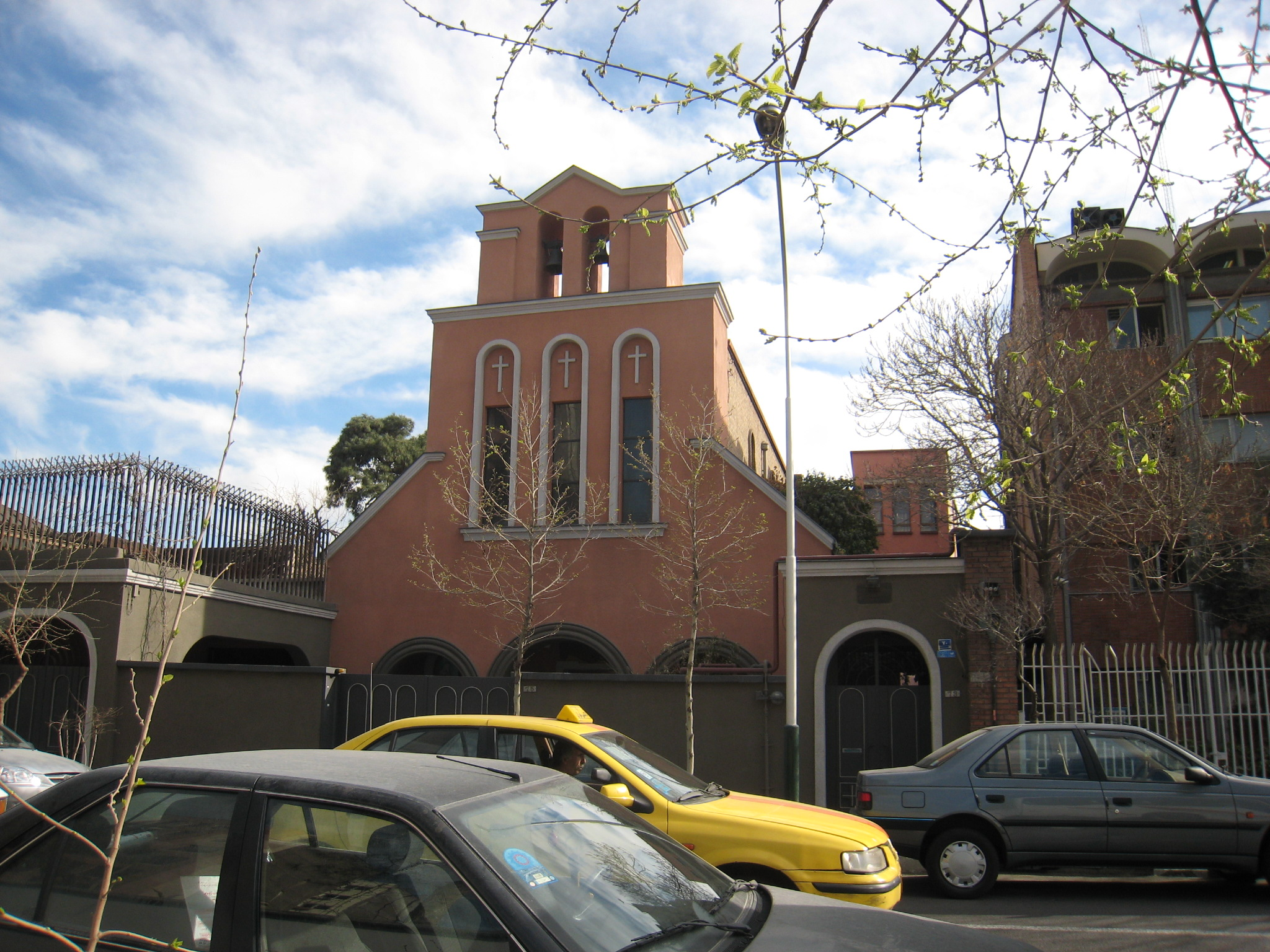
- Cathedral of the Consolata in Tehran

- Location within Iran

Religion
- Affiliation: Catholic Church
- Rite: Latin
- Status: Functioning

Location
- Location: Tehran, Iran
- Coordinates: 35.6969°N 51.4086°E

Architecture
- Completed: 1937

The Cathedral of the Consolata (Persian: کلیسای جامع کنسولاتا), also called the Roman Catholic Cathedral of Tehran, is a Catholic Church building in the city of Tehran, Iran, in which the Latin or Roman rite is followed. The shrine is dedicated to Blessed Virgin Mary under her title of Our Lady of Consolation.

By contrast, it is not the Chaldean Catholic cathedral of Tehran, St. Joseph's Cathedral, where the Chaldean rite is followed. The cathedral is located near the Italian embassy in Tehran.

It is the main church of the Roman Catholic Archdiocese of Teheran-Isfahan (Archidioecesis Teheranensis-Hispahanensis Latinorum), which was created in 1629 by Pope Urban VIII. Today, it is under the pastoral responsibility of Bishop Dominique Mathieu, O.F.M. Conv. Due to the diversity of nationalities of Christians in the city, it offers religious services in various languages.

== See also ==
- Catholic Church in Iran
- Santuario della Consolata
