= St. Joseph's Cathedral, Tehran =

Coordinates: 35°42′16.9″N 51°25′18.3″E

St. Joseph Assyrian Catholic Cathedral
- کلیسای جامع سنت جوزف کاتولیک آشوری
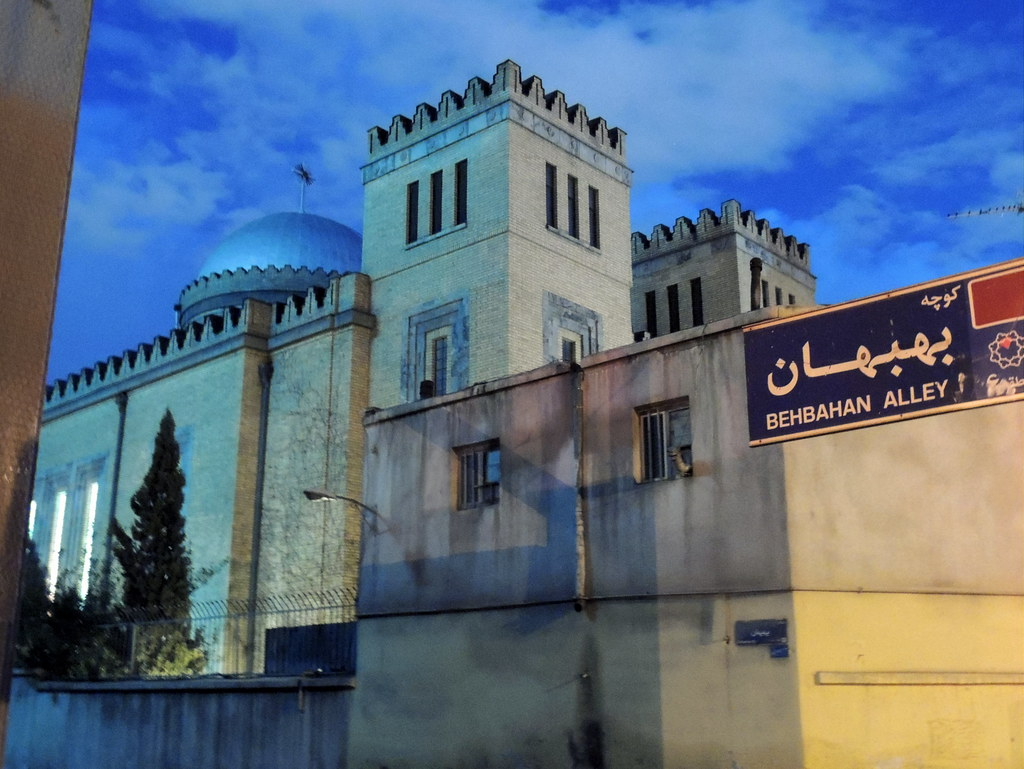
- St. Joseph Assyrian Catholic Cathedral
- Location: Tehran
- Country: Iran
- Denomination: Catholic Church (Chaldean rite)

St. Joseph Assyrian Catholic Church (Persian: کلیسای جامع سنت جوزف کاتولیک آشوری), also called the Chaldean Catholic cathedral of Tehran, is a Catholic Church building in Tehran, Iran, in which the Chaldean rite is followed. It is located north of Enqelab Street, Shahid Abbas Moussavi. It should not be confused with Tehran's Cathedral of the Consolata (where the Latin rite is followed), nor with the Apostolic Armenian Saint Sarkis Cathedral.

It functions as the seat of the persian Catholic Archeparchy of Tehran (Archidioecesis Teheranensis Chaldaeorum), a jurisdiction created for Catholics of the Chaldean rite that was established in 1853 and moved to Teheran in 1944 under the pontificate of Pope Pius XII who depends on the Congregation for the Oriental Churches (Congregatio pro Ecclesiis Orientalibus).

Currently it is under the pastoral responsibility of the Archbishop Ramzi Garmou.

== Gallery ==
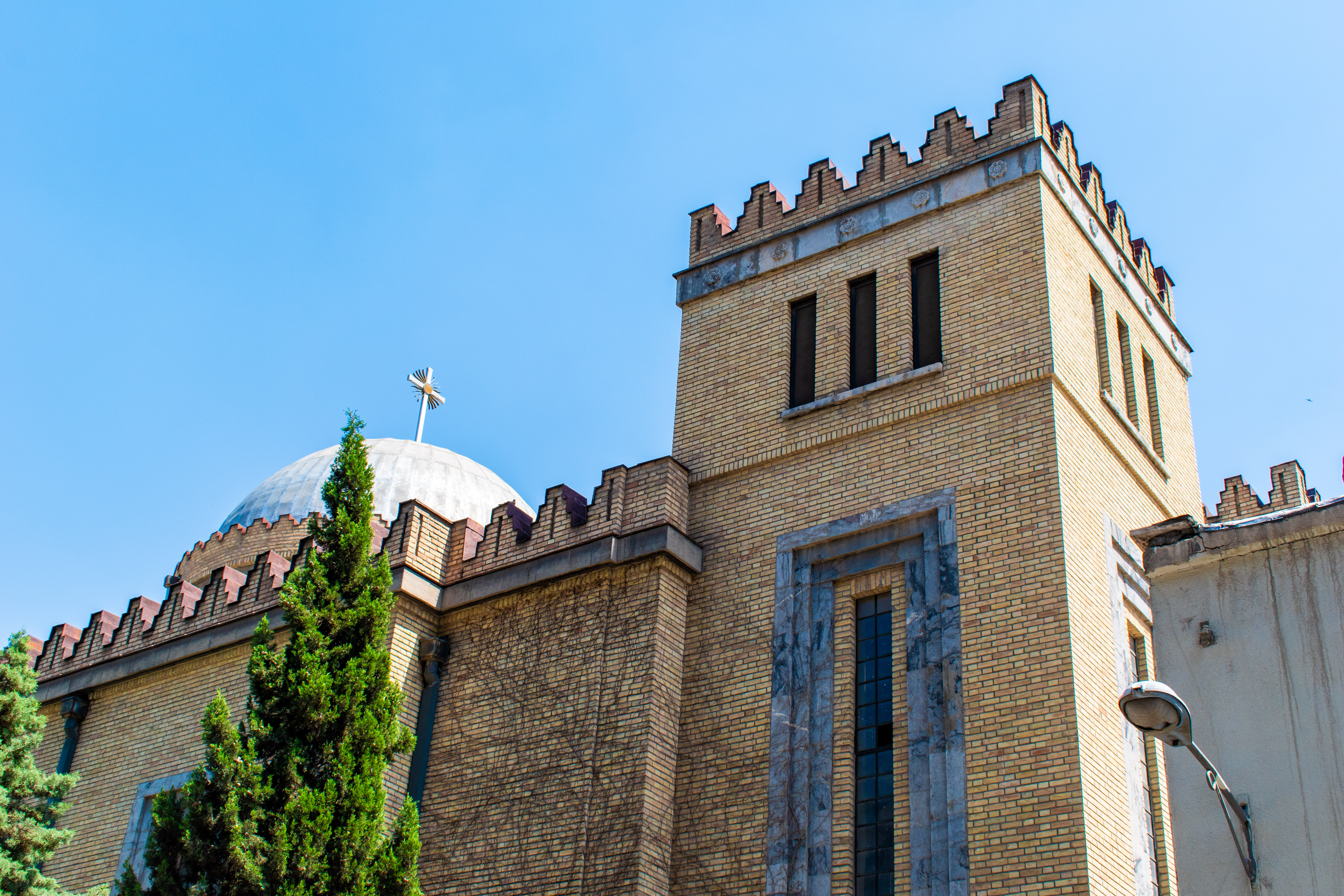

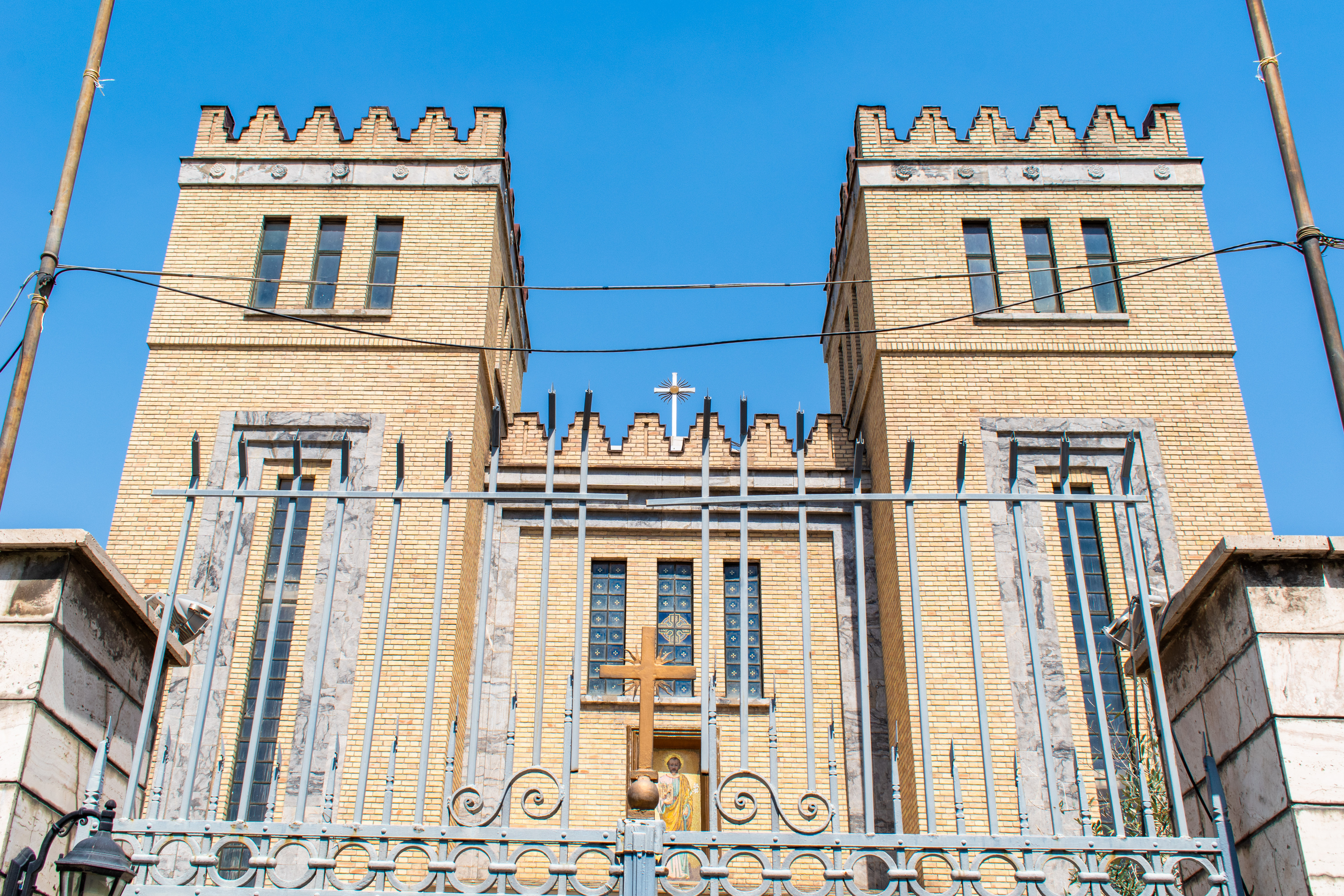

== See also ==
- Catholic Church in Iran
