= Rew-Ardashir (Chaldean Catholic diocese) =

Eastern Catholic titular see

Rew-Ardashir is only Metropolitan titular archbishopric of the Chaldean Catholic Church (Chaldean Rite in Syriac language).

It used to be an eparchy (Eastern Catholic diocese) in that rite-specific Catholic church.

== History ==
The former residential archbishopric had its see in Zaydūn (Iran).

It was nominally restored as a titular see in 1970 and is vacant after having only one incumbent:

- Titular Archbishop Joseph Cheikho (1970.08.22 – 1979.12.20), Metropolitan Archbishop of then Archdiocese of Sehna (Iran; now Teheran) (1944.05.22 – 1970.03.07), also (Latin) Titular Archbishop of Amida (1970.03.07 – 1970.08.22)
