= Santa Giovanna Antida Thouret delle Suore della Carità =

Santa Giovanna Antida Thouret
- Church of Saint Jeanne-Antide Thouret of the Sisters of Charity
- Chiesa di Santa Giovanna Antida Thouret delle Suore della Carità
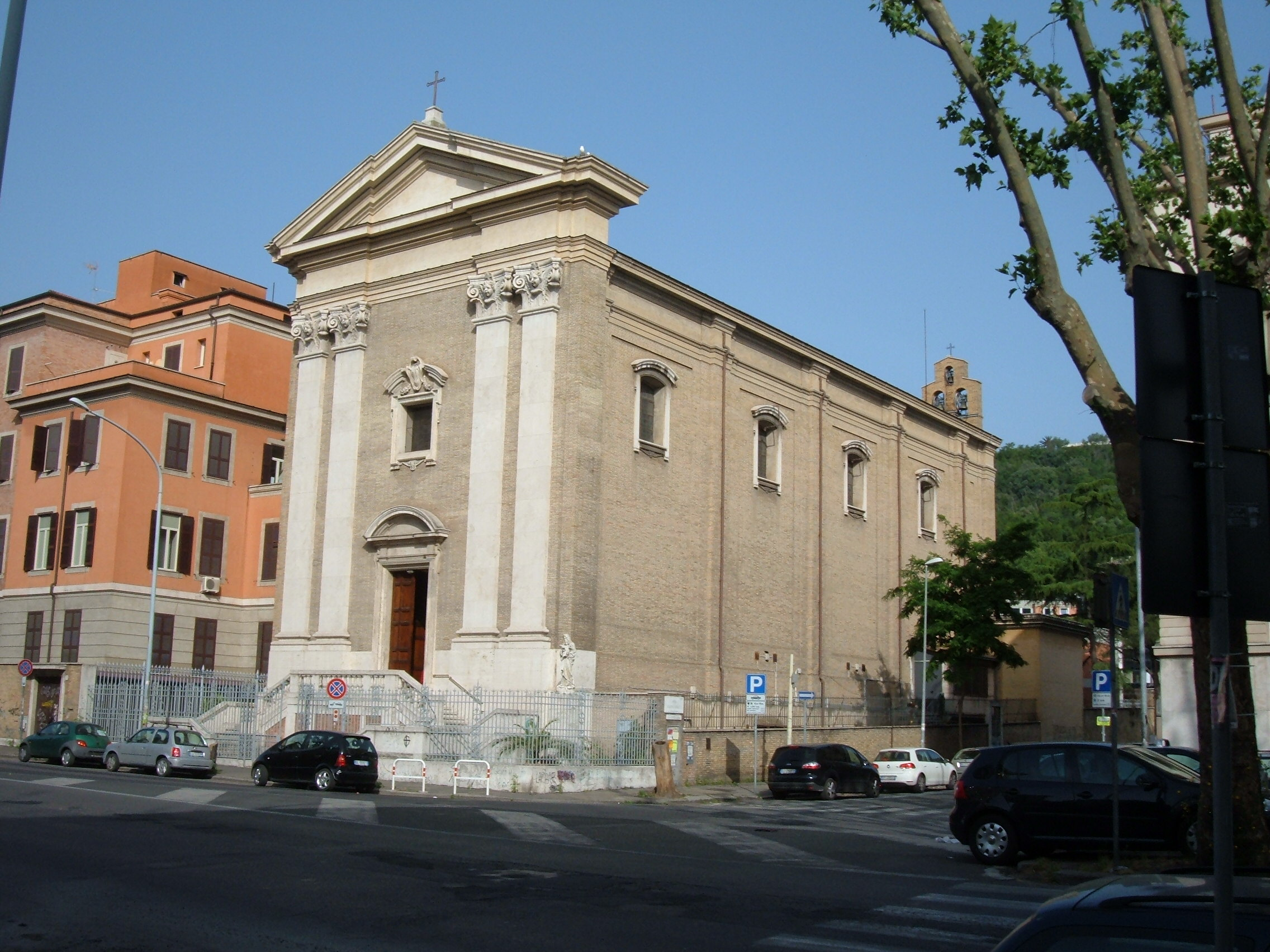

- Location within Rome
- 41°54′53″N 12°27′06″E
- Location: Circonvallazione Clodia 3, Della Vittoria, Rome
- Country: Italy
- Language: Italian
- Denomination: Catholic
- Tradition: Roman Rite
- Religious order: Sisters of Divine Charity

History
- Status: titular church, parish church
- Dedication: Jeanne-Antide Thouret
- Consecrated: 1940

Architecture
- Functional status: active
- Architect: Guglielmo Palombi
- Architectural type: Baroque Revival
- Years built: 1940

Administration
- Diocese: Rome

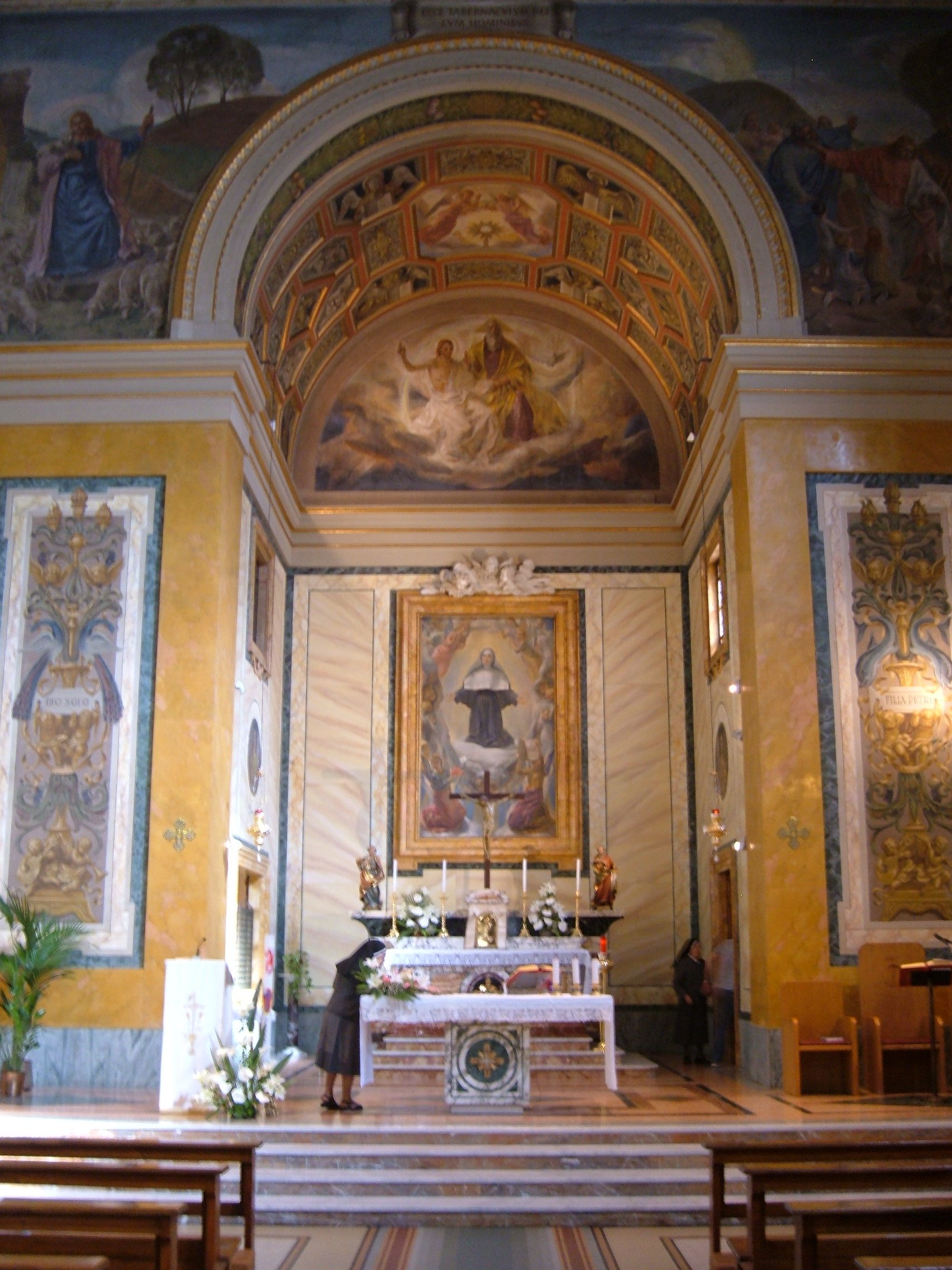
Interior

Santa Giovanna Antida Thouret delle Suore della Carità is a 20th-century parochial church and titular church in northern Rome, dedicated to Saint Jeanne-Antide Thouret (1765–1826).

== History ==
The church was built in 1940 to a design by Guglielmo Palombi; it is built of pink brick in a Baroque Revival style. It is in the care of the Sisters of Divine Charity and is named for their foundress, the French nun Saint Jeanne-Antide Thouret. It should not be confused with the similarly-named Chiesa Parrocchiale di Santa Giovanna Antida Thouret on Via Roberto Ferruzzi.

On 7 December 2024, Pope Francis made it a titular church to be held by a cardinal-priest.

Cardinal-protectors

- Dominique Mathieu (2024 – present)
