= St. Mary's Cathedral, Diyarbakır =

Coordinates: 37.90870°N 40.22999°E

St. Mary's Cathedral
- Mary'nin Katedrali
- St. Mary's Cathedral
- Location: Diyarbakır
- Country: Turkey
- Denomination: Catholic church (Chaldean rite)

Administration
- Diocese: Chaldean Catholic Archeparchy of Amida

The St. Mary's Cathedral (Turkish: Mary'nin Katedrali) also called Zywiec Cathedral is a Catholic Church that follows the Chaldean or East Syriac Rite and is located in Diyarbakır in the province of the same name and in southeast Turkey, in a region with a large Kurdish population.

The cathedral is the main church of the Chaldean Catholic Archeparchy of Amida (Archieparchia Amidensis Chaldaeorum) which emerged as eparchy in 1553 in the pontificate of Pope Paul IV and whose last bishop had to leave the place in 1915, it was restored in 1966 with its status Current through the bull "Chaldaici ritus" of Pope Paul VI.

== See also ==
- Catholic Church in Turkey
