= Abidar =

Mountain in Iran

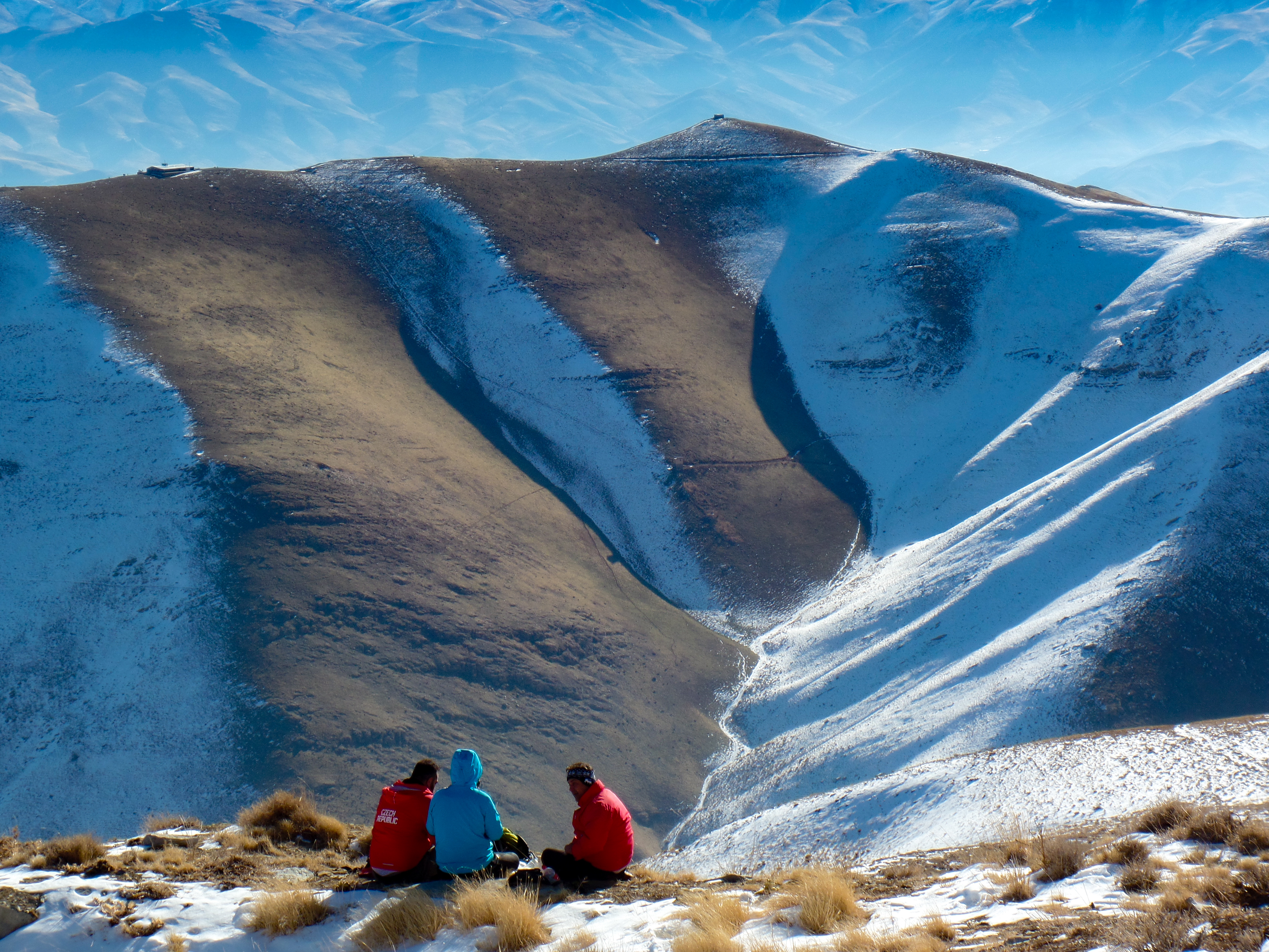

Highest point
- Elevation: 2,550 m (8,370 ft)
- Coordinates: 35.3115017°N 46.9877368°E

Geography
- Location: Kurdistan Province, Iran

Abidar (Persian: آبیدر; Kurdish: ئاویه‌ر, Awyer) is a mountain to the West of Sanandaj, in Rojhelat of Kurdistan, situated in Iran. With an elevation of 2550 metres, Mount Abidar is made of Upper Cretaceous rocks and is located in the Sanandaj-Sirjan geological and structural zone. This mountain is the place where the residents of Sanandaj go hiking and has many beautiful sub parks like "Emîriye" Jungle Park. Awyer main Jungle Park was designed and renewed in 1995 by the mayor of the time, Ardavan Nosoudi. He built and designed new roads to the highest places of the mount to increase the accessibility even for older people, without destroying the original view.

== Abidar outdoor Cinema ==
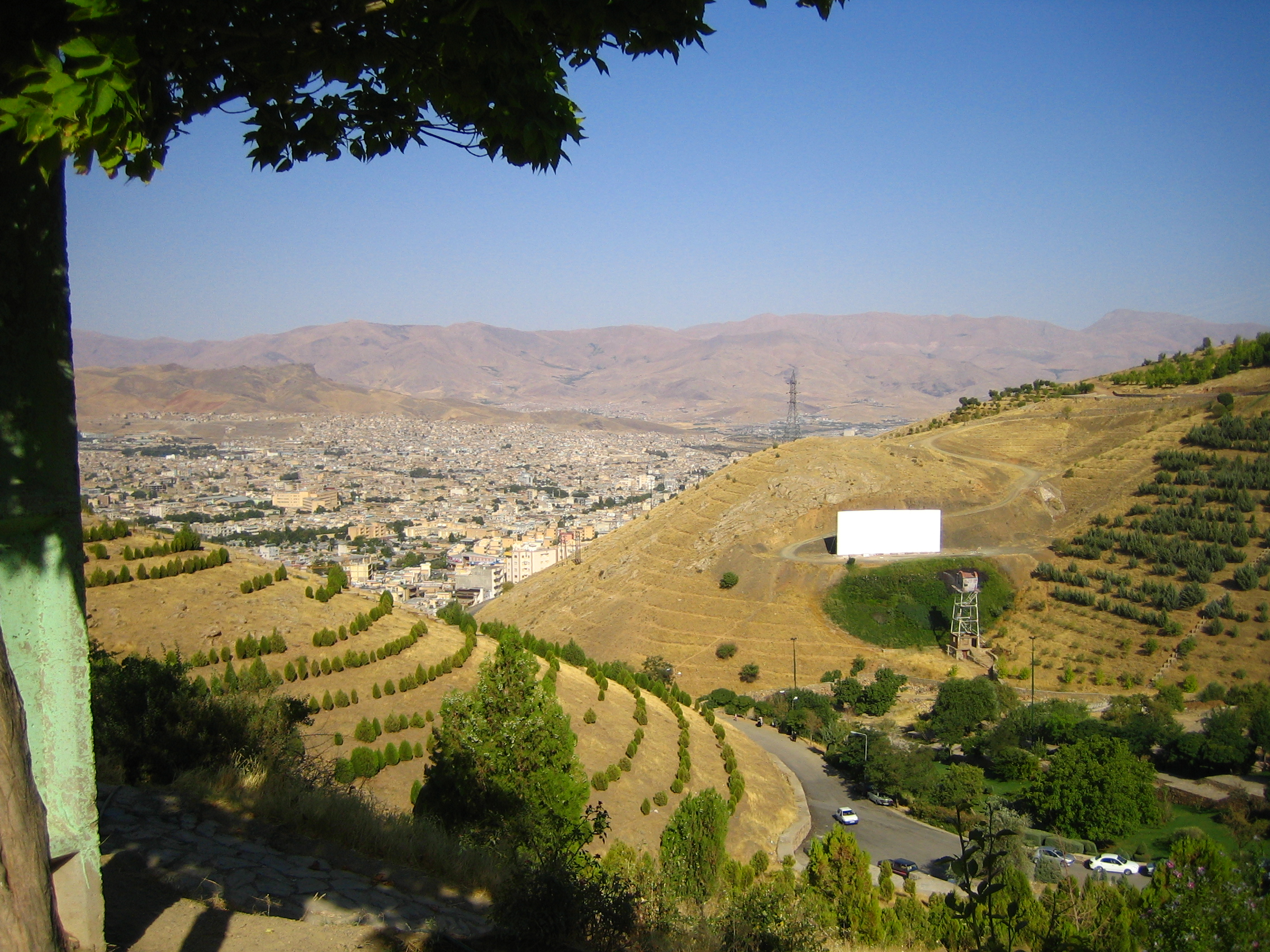
Abidar outdoor cinema

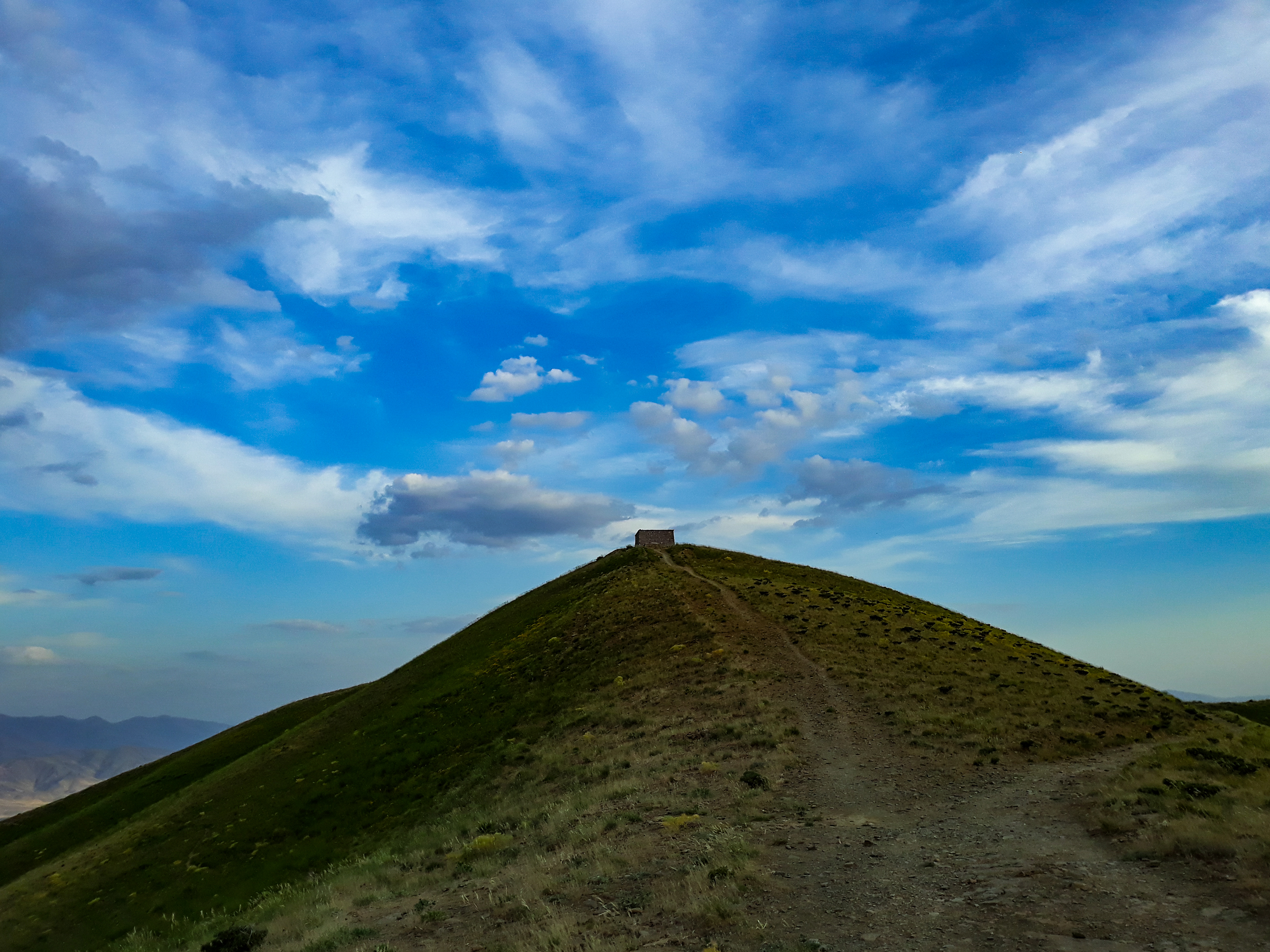
Abidar peak

Abidar Open Air Cinema, one of the world's biggest outdoor cinemas was built over the Amireih valley by mayor Ardavan Nosoudi in 1995. There was formerly a movie screened every Friday. Until just a few years ago, the only video that could be played in the Abidar cinema was by 35 mm movie projectors. The audio, which was broadcast via FM radio, often had issues syncing with the projected visuals. The Municipality recently switched from 35mm film to Digital Cinema projector.
