= Dominique Mathieu =

Belgian Catholic archbishop (born 1963)

His Eminence Dominique Mathieu O.F.M. Conv.
- Cardinal; Archbishop of Tehran–Isfahan
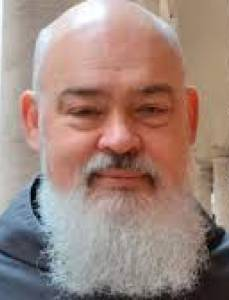
- Church: Catholic Church
- Archdiocese: Tehran–Isfahan
- Appointed: 8 January 2021
- Predecessor: Ignazio Bedini
- Other post: Cardinal-Priest of Santa Giovanna Antida Thouret (2024–)
- Previous posts: Definitor general and general assistant for the Central Europe Federation of the Order of Friars Minor Conventual (2019–2021)

Orders
- Ordination: 24 September 1989
- Consecration: 16 February 2021 by Leonardo Sandri
- Created cardinal: 7 December 2024 by Pope Francis
- Rank: Cardinal-Priest

Personal details
- Born: Dominique Joseph Mathieu; 13 June 1963 (age 63) Arlon, Luxembourg (province), Belgium
- Residence: Cathedral of the Consolata, Tehran, Iran
- Motto: Deus meus in Te confido (My God I trust in You)
- Coat of arms

Styles of Dominique Joseph Mathieu
- Reference style: His Eminence
- Spoken style: Your Eminence
- Religious style: Cardinal
- Informal style: Cardinal
- See: Tehran–Isfahan

Dominique Joseph Mathieu, O.F.M. Conv. (born 13 June 1963) is a Belgian Catholic prelate who has served as Archbishop of Tehran–Isfahan since 2021. He is a member of the Order of Friars Minor Conventual. He was made a cardinal on 7 December 2024 by Pope Francis.

== Biography ==
Dominique Mathieu was born in Arlon in Belgian Luxembourg, the southernmost province of Belgium, on 13 June 1963. Growing up he lived in Damme, though by his own account he grew up in Bruges, a few miles away, where he studied with the Xaverian Brothers. Inspired by the figure of Maximilian Kolbe, he developed a relationship with the Order of Friars Minor Conventual in Louvain. He joined that order at 21 and professed his solemn vows on 20 September 1987. He was ordained a deacon on 1 April 1989 and a priest on 24 September 1989.

Within his Franciscan order he has held various positions: vocational promoter, secretary, vicar and provincial minister of the Belgian province of the Friars Minor Conventual, serving as delegate general when the provinces of Belgium and France merged; rector of the national shrine of Saint Anthony of Padua in Brussels and director of its Confraternity. He was also president of two non-profit organizations that support the Friars Minor Conventual in Belgium, and had responsibilities with the Catholic School of Landen. He has served as president of the Central Europe Federation of the Friars Minor Conventual (Austria, Croatia, Denmark, Germany, Holland, Slovenia, Sweden, Switzerland) and was a member of the Franciscans' International Commission for the Economy.

He moved to Lebanon in 2013 and was incardinated in the Provincial Custody of the East and of the Holy Land. He served that province as custodial secretary, formator, master of novices and rector of postulants and candidates.

From 2019 to 2021 he was definitor general and general assistant for the Central Europe Federation of the Friars Minor Conventual.

Pope Francis appointed him Archbishop of Tehran–Isfahan on 8 January 2021. He received his episcopal consecration on 16 February 2021 from Cardinal Leonardo Sandri, with Cardinal Mauro Gambetti and Ignazio Bedini, Archbishop Emeritus of Tehran and Mathieu's immediate predecessor, as co-consecrators, in Rome's Basilica of the Twelve Apostles, and left Rome in November to take possession of his see, where the Cathedral of the Consolata, the bishop's residence, and the diocesan offices are located on the grounds of the Italian embassy in Tehran. In March 2021 he told an interviewer that from the time he entered religious life he "almost always felt affinity with the Islamic world".

On 6 October 2024, Pope Francis announced that he planned to make Mathieu a cardinal in December. On 7 December 2024, the Pope did so, assigning him as a member of the order of cardinal priests the title of Santa Giovanna Antida Thouret. He became the third cardinal associated with modern Iran. (Note: He is the first cardinal to head the Latin Catholic Diocese in Iran since its founding as the Diocese of Isfahan of the Latins (Latin: Archidioecesis Hispahanensis Latinorum, Persian: اسقف‌نشین کاتولیک رومی اصفهان, romanized: Ōsghof-neshin Kātolik Romi Esfahān) in 1629 by Pope Urban VIII, when Isfahan was the capital of Iran under the Safavid Dynasty. Two other prelates, Angelo Dolci and Giuseppe Paupini, who led the Holy See's diplomatic representation in Iran in the twentieth century and later became cardinals, but they did not have ecclesiastical responsibilities in Iran.) He participated in the 2025 papal conclave that resulted in the election of Pope Leo XIV.

Mathieu has been described as having "a passion for astronomy". Following the US and Israeli assaults on Iran beginning on 28 February 2026, he has discouraged the use of weapons and inspired an inner peace and justice equivalent to what "God wants for His children". He was evacuated from Tehran and arrived in Rome on 8 March.

== See also ==
- Catholic Church in Iran
- Cardinals created by Pope Francis
