= Ignazio Bedini =

Iranian archbishop

His Excellency, The Most Reverend Ignazio Bedini
- Archbishop Emeritus of Ispahan, Iran
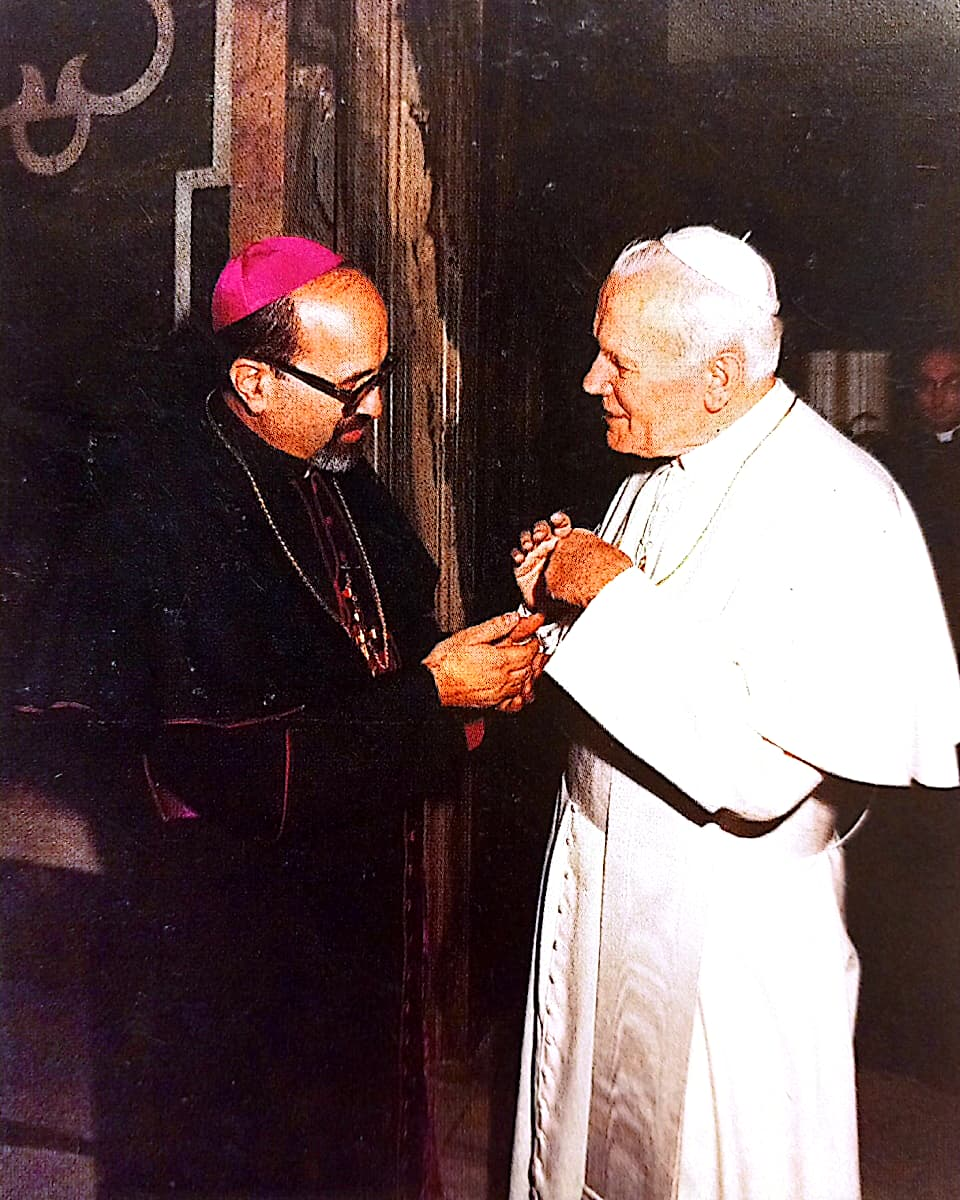
- Bedini (left)
- Church: Catholic Church
- Archdiocese: Teheran-Isfahan
- Appointed: 2 December 1989
- Term ended: 20 January 2015
- Predecessor: Kevin William Barden
- Successor: Dominique Mathieu

Orders
- Ordination: 21 December 1968 by Giacomo Giuseppe Beltritti
- Consecration: 6 January 1990 by Pope John Paul II

Personal details
- Born: 27 June 1939 (age 87) Sassomorello, frazione of Prignano sulla Secchia, Italy

Ignazio Bedini, S.D.B. (born 27 June 1939) is an Italian prelate of the Catholic Church who was Archbishop of Ispahan (Isfahan) in Iran from 1989 to 2015.

Bedini was born in Sassomorello, near Modena, Italy, and ordained as a priest of the Order of the Salesians of Saint John Bosco on 21 December 1969. He was appointed archbishop of Ispahan on 2 December 1989 and consecrated on 6 January 1990. He resided in Tehran. He was the head of the Catholic Bishops' Conference of Iran, though he was the only Latin Rite member of the conference, with the others being of the Armenian and Chaldean Rites.

Archbishop Bedini's retirement was announced by the Holy See effective 20 January 2015.
