= Church of Our Lady of the Rosary, New Julfa =

Iranian national heritage site

Church of Our Lady of the Rosary
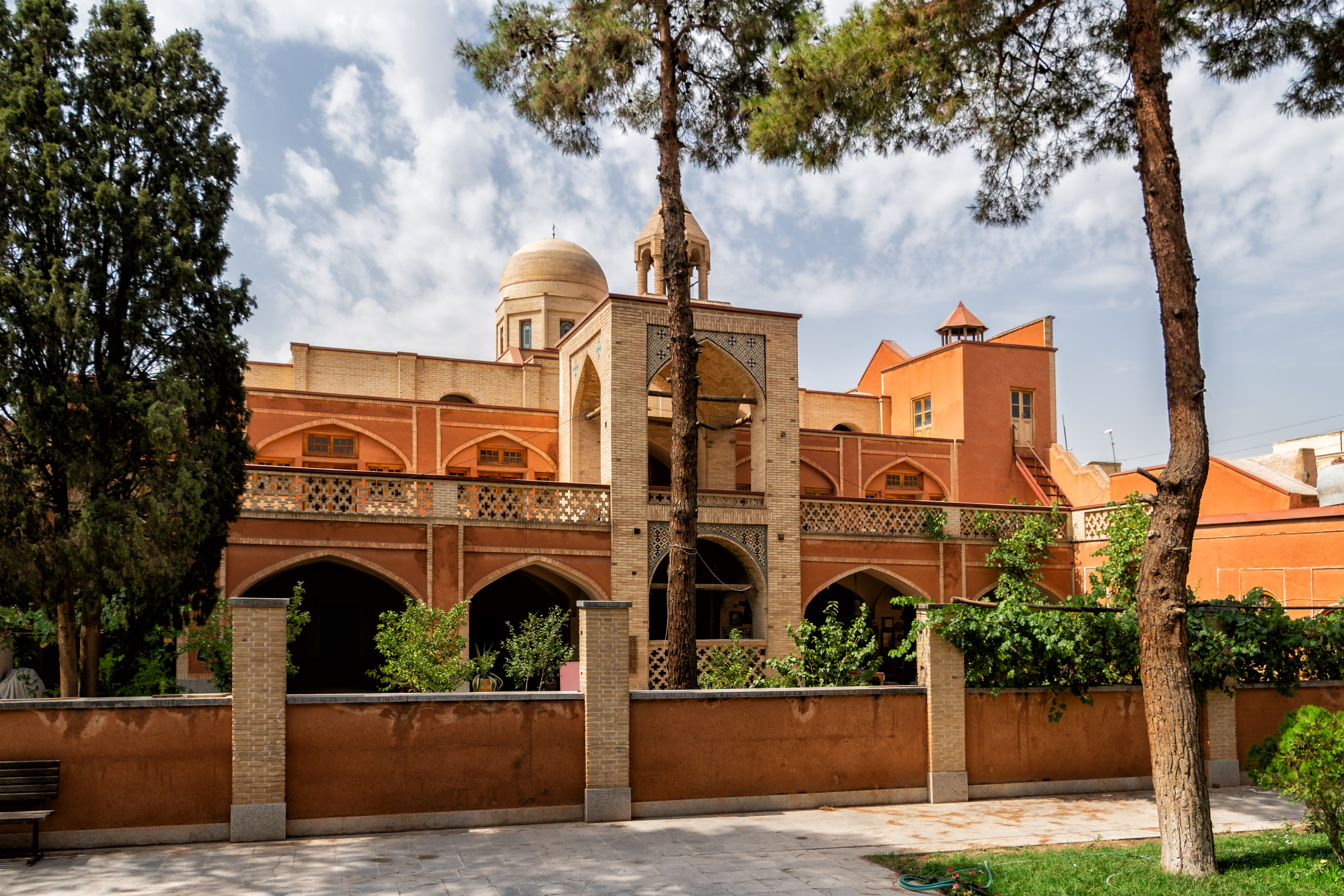
- Church of Our Lady of the Rosary in New Julfa

- Location within Iran

Religion
- Affiliation: Catholic Church
- Rite: Latin
- Status: Active

Location
- Location: New Julfa, Isfahan, Iran
- Coordinates: 32.63103559°N 51.64961725°E

Architecture
- Style: Isfahani
- Completed: 1681; 1705 (Reconstruction)

Church of Our Lady of the Rosary, is a Roman Catholic church in New Julfa, Iran. It is located in Kocher neighbourhood of New Julfa, next to the Armenian Church of Saint Nerses.

== History ==
In 1657, Italian Dominicans, with the help of Catholic Armenians started their existence in New Julfa. This church was established in 1681 and dedicated to the Blessed Virgin Mary under their patronal title of Our Lady of the Rosary'. In 1705, it was rebuilt and enlarged.

In the 18th century, the last Dominicans left New Julfa, leaving church in the care of the few remaining Armenian Catholics. In 1903, French Lazarists took charge of the church and built a school close to the church. Later, they moved to Isfahan city centre and once again left the church in the care of the small community of Catholic Armenians. After the migration of Catholic Armenians to Tehran, the Church of Our Lady of the Rosary was abandoned and fell into disrepair. Finally in 2005 the church was totally renovated.

== See also ==
- Christianity in the Safavid Empire
- Catholic Church in Iran
- Roman Catholic Archdiocese of Ispahan
- Armenian Catholic Eparchy of Isfahan
