= Saint Abraham's Church, Tehran =

Roman Catholic church in Tehran, Iran

Saint Abraham's Church
- کلیسای حضرت ابراهیم
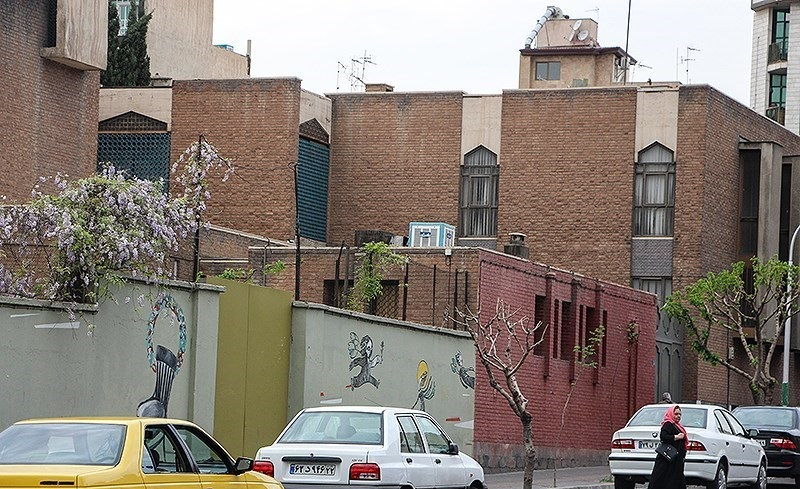
- Saint Abraham's Church.

- Location within Iran

Religion
- Affiliation: Catholic Church, Dominican Order

Location
- Location: Tehran, Iran
- Coordinates: 35.70345°N 51.38702°E

Architecture
- Groundbreaking: 23 May 1966

Saint Abraham's Church (Persian: کلیسای حضرت ابراهیم) is a Dominican Catholic church in Tehran, Iran. It was opened in 1966 and is staffed by the Dominican province of Ireland. It is attended by various expatriate communities within Iran.

== History ==
In 1962 the Vatican asked the Dominican Order to return to Iran. The Dominican province of Ireland agreed to establish a community in Tehran. Father William Barden (who later became Archbishop) was the first to arrive, and was soon joined by Father Hugh Brennan. They rented a house near Tehran University in Professor Brown Street. They dedicated it to Our Lady of the Rosary, like the earlier house in Isfahan, and it was known as "Rosary House". On 23 May 1966 the new Dominican House and Church of Saint Abraham was opened in Jamalzadeh Shomali Street. The Irish Dominican province still staff the church. The church has also been used by various diasporas for celebrations of their respective national days. Following the Iranian Revolution, the Iranian Revolutionary Guard would actively monitor the church during any services that involved gatherings where non-Iranian nationals would attend.

The church is dedicated to Saint Abraham. Abraham is Father in Faith of three religions, Christianity, Islam and Judaism. By choosing Abraham as the patron of the church, the Dominicans signaled their wish for it to become a place of study, encounter, and understanding between people of different faiths. In 2013, the church was forced by the Iranian authorities to no longer conduct services in the Persian language.
