= Kevin William Barden =

Irish Catholic prelate (1908–2004)

The Most Reverend Kevin William Barden OP
- Archbishop Emeritus of Ispahan, Iran
- Diocese: Ispahan
- See: Ispahan
- Appointed: 30 May 1974
- Term ended: 12 August 1982
- Successor: Ignazio Bedini

Orders
- Ordination: 28 February 1931
- Consecration: 25 October 1974 by Mario Brini

Personal details
- Born: Kevin William Barden; 3 June 1908 Dublin, Ireland
- Died: 4 December 2004 (aged 96) Raheny, Dublin, Ireland
- Buried: Tallaght
- Denomination: Roman Catholic

Kevin William Barden, OP (3 June 1908 – 4 December 2004) was an Irish Catholic prelate who served as archbishop of Isfahan from 1974 to 1982. He previously served as parish priest of the St. Abraham's Church in Tehran. He was a member of the Dominican Order.

== Early life and ordination ==
Barden was born in Dublin in 1908 and was one of five children. His father, Thomas Garret Barden, worked for the Irish Independent.

Barden was educated at Synge Street CBS. He entered the Dominican Order in Tallaght in 1924 and took the religious name William. He studied philosophy in Tallaght and theology in Rome. He was ordained on 28 February 1931.

== Priest and bishop ==
After ordination, Barden earned a doctorate at the University of Fribourg. He taught theology in the Dominican house of studies St. Mary's Priory in Tallaght and gave public lectures for thirty years until he went to establish a Dominican presence in Tehran in 1961.

A church and parish were established in Iran at the request of the Vatican. Barden was joined by Father Hugh Brennan and they rented a house near Tehran University that they named Rosary House. The numbers of people attending Mass increased to the extent that Barden organized the construction of a purpose-built parish church which became known as St. Abraham's.

In 1970 he was appointed apostolic administrator of Isfahan. He was consecrated as archbishop of Isfahan on 25 October 1974. He remained in Iran until the Islamic Revolution; he was expelled in 1980.

He returned to Ireland, and with no prospect of returning to Iran he submitted his resignation to Pope John Paul II in 1982.

In 1991 he moved to the Sacred Heart nursing home in Raheny, where he died in 2004.

Catholic Church titles
Preceded by Jacques-Emile Sontag	Roman Catholic Archdiocese of Ispahan; 25 October 1974 – 12 August 1982	Succeeded by Ignazio Bedini
