= Chaldean Catholic Archeparchy of Amida =

Eastern Catholic archeparchy in Turkey

Coordinates: 41°01′N 28°58′E

Archeparchy of Diyarbakır Amidensis Chaldaeorum Diyarbakır'dan bir Archeparchy

Location
- Country: Turkey

Statistics
- Population: (as of 2013); 7,640
- Parishes: 9

Information
- Rite: Chaldean Catholic Church
- Established: 1553 (As Eparchy of Diarbekir); 3 January 1966 (As Archeparchy of Diarbekir)
- Cathedral: St. Mary's Cathedral, Diyarbakır

Current leadership
- Pope: Leo XIV
- Patriarch: Louis Raphaël I Sako
- Archbishop: Vacant
- Bishops emeritus: Ramzi Garmou

The Archeparchy of Amida (or Diyarbakır) is the Chaldean Catholic eparchy in Turkey, with its archiepiscopal see in Diyarbakır, Turkey.

== History ==
It was first established in 1531 as the Chaldean Diocese of Amid(a). In June 1915 it gained territory from the suppressed Chaldean Catholic Diocese of Seert (now a titular see).

After the Assyrian genocide it was left vacant and lapsed after the death of its archbishop in 1923. Nevertheless, the size of the diocese increased on 3 July 1957 from the suppression of the Chaldean Catholic Diocese of Gazireh.

On 3 January 1966, it was promoted to an Archeparchy (Eastern Catholic archdiocese) and a new archbishop was ordained to fill the role. Since that point, it has been the sole Chaldean diocese in Turkey, and in effect resides over all of Turkey's Chaldo-Assyrians.

Its episcopal see was historically located at St. Mary's Cathedral in Diyarbekir, and it still is in modern day. Today, the archeparch (or archbishop) resides in Beyoğlu, Istanbul. Members of the Chaldean Catholic community use the Holy Trinity Greek Catholic Cathedral as their church; it was formerly used by members of the Greek Catholic Apostolic Exarchate of Istanbul.

== Demographics ==
The most recent data indicates that the population is 7,640, up from 6,000 in 1980.

Statistics

1980 6,000

1990 1,400

1999 5,000

2001 5,100

2002 5,100

2003 4,800

2004 5,925

2006 4,226

2009 6,219

2013 7,640

== Episcopal incumbents ==
(incomplete)

Eparchs

...

Archeparchs

- Gabriel Batta (1966.01.03 – 1977.03.07)
- Paul Karatas (1977.03.07 – 2005.01.16)
- apostolic administrator François Yakan (2007 - 2018.12.22)
- Ramzi Garmou (2018.12.23 – 2023.05.24.)
- Sabri Anar (2023.05.24 – 2026.10.17.)

The Archeparch (archbishop) is immediately subject to the Patriarch of Babylon, who heads the Chaldean Catholic Church.

== See also ==
- Catholic Church in Turkey
