= Holy See–Iran relations =

- Iran: Vatican City

Holy See–Iran relations refers to the diplomatic relations between the Holy See, which is sovereign over the Vatican City, and the Islamic Republic of Iran. Relations, or similarities, have also been noted between Roman Catholicism and Shia Islam, which are the official religions of the Holy See and Iran, respectively. A few Iranian presidents and diplomats have visited Vatican City, including Mohammad Khatami in 1999 and Hassan Rouhani in 2016.

== History ==
Early relations began during the reign of Shah Abbas the Great, when the Persian embassies visited the pope. The two countries have had formal diplomatic relations since 1954, since the pontificate of Pope Pius XII. Relations have been maintained during the Iranian Revolution. Iran has a large diplomatic corps at the Vatican, with only the Dominican Republic having more diplomats accredited to the Holy See. Pope Paul VI was welcomed to Tehran by Mohammad Reza Pahlavi during an airport visit on 26 November 1970.

In 1979, Pope John Paul II sent envoy to Iran to help to solve the Hostage Crisis. In 2008, relations between Iran and the Holy See were "warming", and Mahmoud Ahmadinejad "said the Vatican was a positive force for justice and peace" when he met with the Papal nuncio to Iran, Archbishop Jean-Paul Gobel.

According to an online news story article by Carol Glatz of Catholic News Service posted on the CNS website on Thursday, 7 October 2010, President Ahmadinejad "told Pope Benedict XVI that he would like to work more closely with the Vatican in an effort to stop religious intolerance and the breakup of families. The president also appealed to world religions to cooperate in the fight against secularism and materialism, Iranian news agencies reported. The appeals came in a letter that was handed to the pope by Iranian Vice President for Parliamentary Affairs Sayyed Mohammad-Reza Mir-Tajeddini, during a brief meeting on 6 October at the Vatican. Vatican spokesman Jesuit Father Federico Lombardi confirmed to Catholic News Service on 7 October that the letter was given to the pope and its contents already published by Iranian media outlets. According to reports, the letter praised the pope and the Vatican for criticizing a U.S. pastor's threats to burn copies of the Qur'an on 11 September. On 3 November, the Pope sent the Iranian President a letter in reply, in which he stated that the establishment of a bilateral Vatican-Iranian commission would be a desirable step towards solving the problems of the Catholic Church in Iran.

== See also ==
- Foreign relations of the Holy See
- Foreign relations of Iran
