= Jesuits in Safavid Iran =

During the 16th century, the first European missionaries to reach the Persian Gulf were the Christian Jesuit Order. Francis Xavier, the founder of the Jesuit mission in Goa in India, chose Gaspar Barzaeus from the Dutch Republic to be their leader. Barzaeus arrived on the island of Hormuz in 1549 and spent the following year writing a great deal of reports. He and his soldiers functioned freely while on the island, benefiting from Hormuz's open religious environment.

Many Muslims were baptized by Barzaeus, reportedly including Turan Shah, the island's nominal ruler. A few prominent individuals were also won over by him, including the daughter and wife of a Safavid diplomat traveling through Hormuz on his way to India. He also attempted to turn mosques into churches and forbid Jews from staying in Hormuz, thus risking a hostile reaction from the ruling Safavid Shah Tahmasp I (r. 1524–1576) and the local populace. In 1568, the Jesuits departed Hormuz due to the intolerable climate and a population that did not respond well to their campaign of conversion.

The Jesuits returned to Iran some decades later. Volunteering to be the first Christian missionaries to reach the Iranian capital of Isfahan, they left their base in Mughal India. With the establishment of Jesuit outposts in Yerevan, Shamakhi, and Ganja, their influence had expanded to Shirvan and Armenia by the late 17th century.

Following the collapse of the Safavid government, little is known regarding Jesuit activity in Iran.

== See also ==
- Catholic Church in Iran

== Sources ==
- Matthee, Rudi (2008). "Jesuits in Safavid Persia". In Yarshater, Ehsan (ed.). Encyclopædia Iranica. Vol. XIV/6: Japan IV. Iranians in Japan–Jobbāʾi. London and New York: Routledge & Kegan Paul. pp. 634–638. ISBN 978-1-934283-07-3.
