= Archdiocese of Tehran–Isfahan =

Archdiocese in Iran

Coordinates: 35.6969°N 51.4086°E

Archdiocese of Tehran–Isfahan of the Latins Archidiœcesis Teheranensis-Hispahanensis Latinorum
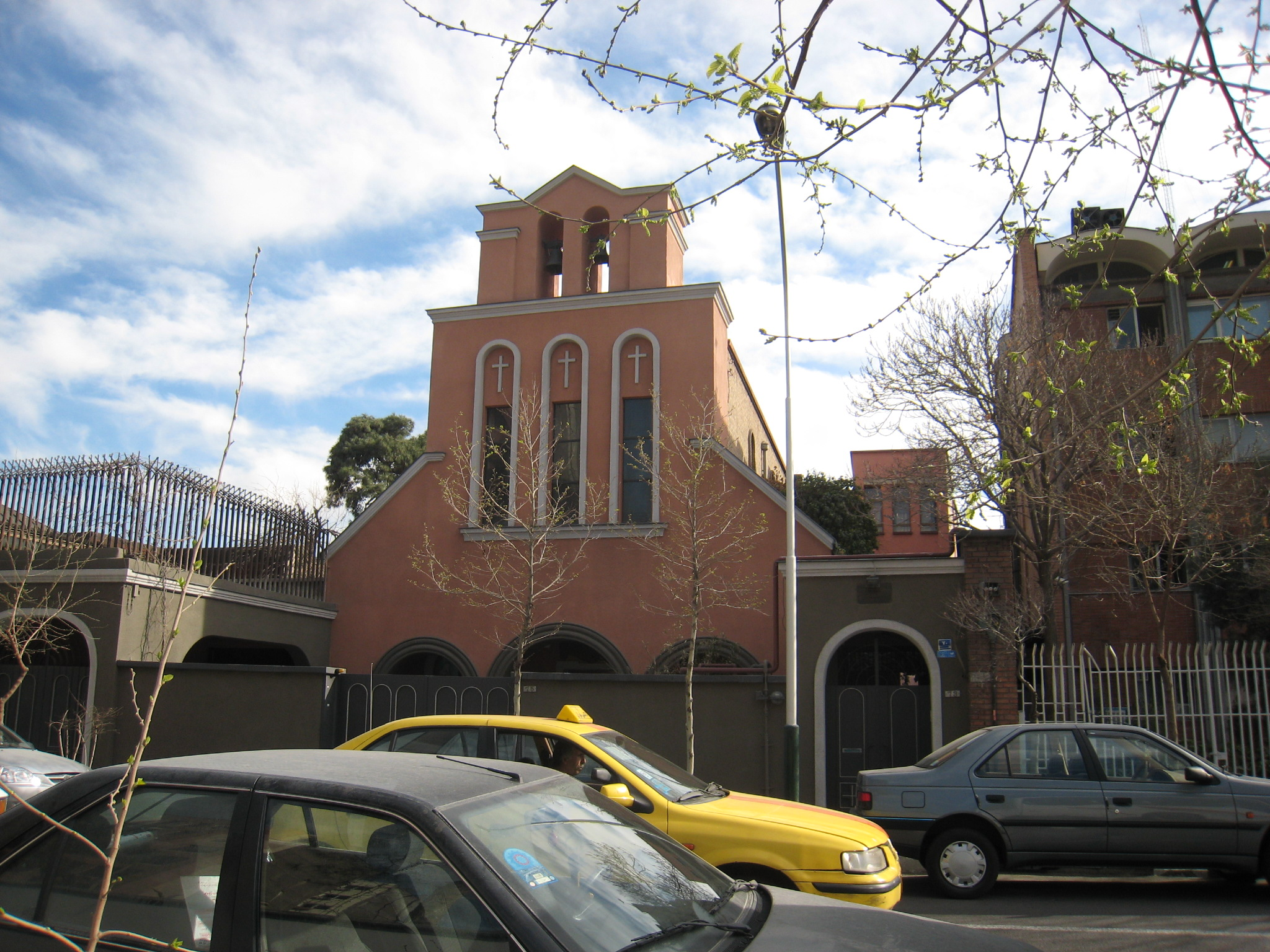

Location
- Country: Iran
- Territory: Tehran, Isfahan, Tabriz
- Metropolitan: Immediately subject to the Holy See

Information
- Rite: Latin Rite
- Cathedral: Cathedral of the Consolata, Tehran

Current leadership
- Pope: Leo XIV
- Archbishop: Dominique Mathieu, O.F.M. Conv.

The Archdiocese of Tehran–Isfahan of the Latins (Latin: Archidioecesis Teheranensis-Hispahanensis Latinorum; Persian: اسقف‌نشین کاتولیک رومی تهران-اصفهان, romanized: Ōsghof-neshin Kātolik Romi Tehrān-Esfahān) is a Latin Catholic jurisdiction of the Catholic Church in Iran.

Pope Francis changed the name of this jurisdiction to the Archdiocese of Tehran–Isfahan of the Latins from the Archdiocese of Isfahan of the Latins on 8 January 2021.

Besides a small number of Latin Rite locals, most Catholics in Iran are foreigners living in the country. The majority of Catholics in Iran belong to the Chaldean Catholic Church, and there is also a small Armenian Catholic diocese.

== Predecessor in the 14th century ==
Catholic presence in Iran has always been a function of the relations between the Pope and the rulers of Iran. The first Catholic diocese in Iran was founded by Dominicans in 1318 at Soltaniyeh which then was the capital of the Mongol Ilkhanate. It lasted less than 100 years into the beginning of the 15th century and disappeared during the conquests of Tamerlane.

== History ==
The diocese was established by Italian Dominican friars on 12 October 1629 when Isfahan was the capital of the Safavid Empire. The cathedral was situated in the then Christian suburb of New Julfa. This diocese continued under the rule of Shah Safi I.

The next appointments of bishops were only possible with longer interruptions from 1693 until 1708 (Elias Mutton) and from 1716 until 1731 (Barnabas Fedeli). The small Catholic community in Isfahan was devastated by the Afghan invasion of the city in 1722. In consequence the titular diocese was administered from the see of Baghdad with only a handful of Catholic families surviving in Isfahan.

In the 19th century, Catholic missionaries were able to restart activities in Iran. From their center in Urmia, apostolic administrators tried to reorganize the Latin Church in the country. In 1896, the Lazarist missionary François Lesné was made bishop of Isfahan. Like his successor, Jacques-Emile Sontag, he resided in Urmia in Western Iran which until World War I held a sizeable Christian population of Assyrians. The diocese was elevated to an archdiocese on 1 July 1910.

After the devastation of the Christian population during and after World War I, the see of Isfahan fell vacant again.

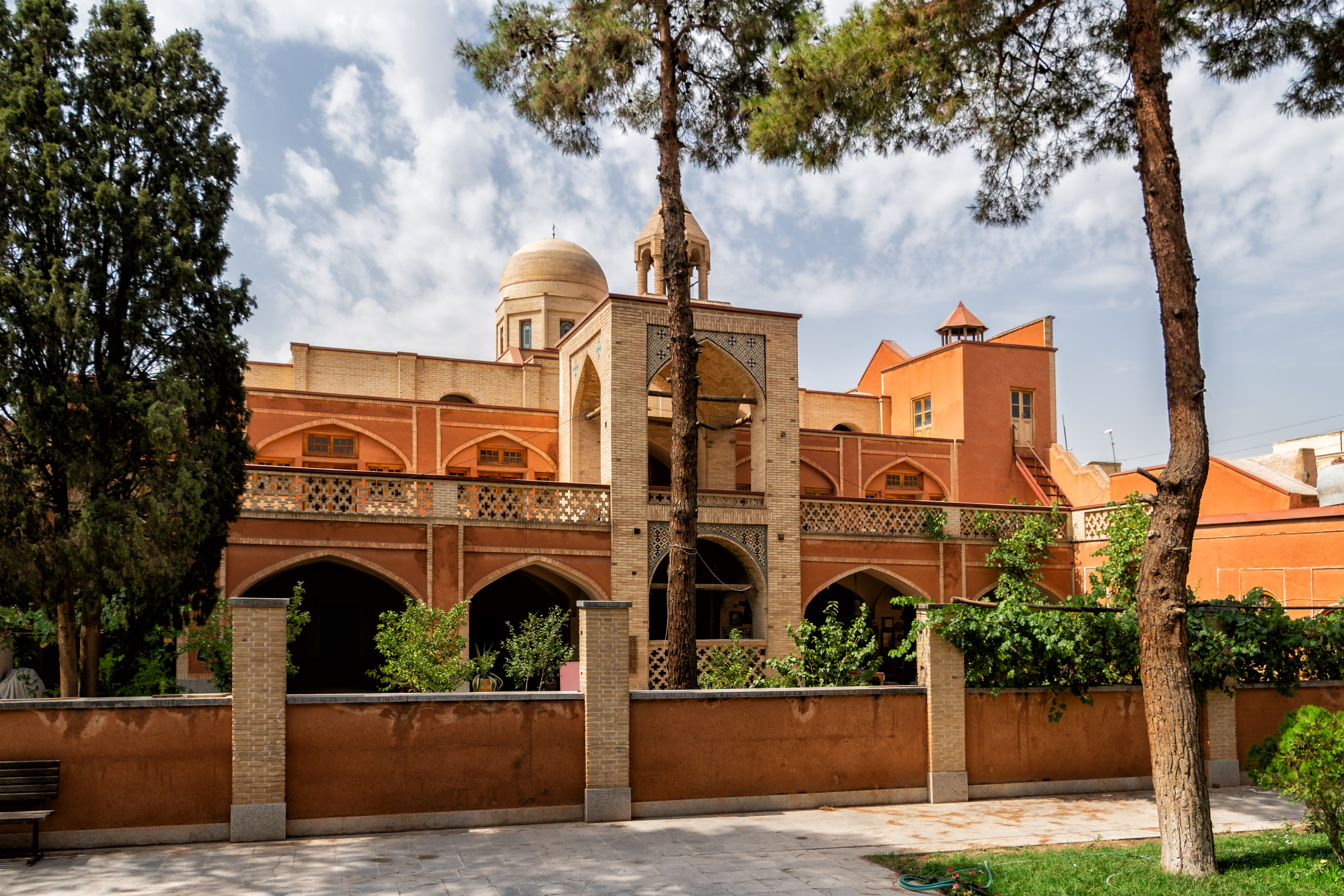
Church of Our Lady of the Rosary, New Julfa

It was not until 1974 that a new archbishop of Isfahan could be instituted. For this the Dominican priest Kevin William Barden at Tehran was chosen. Since then the see of the diocese has been at Tehran. When Barden was expelled from the country in the beginning of the Islamic revolution in 1980, it took another 9 years until the Salesian Ignazio Bedini was consecrated new archbishop. Following his retirement in 2014, the diocese was administered by an apostolic administrator until the consecration of Dominique Joseph Mathieu in 2021.

== Leadership ==
Bishops

- Bishop Juan Boldames Ibáñez, O.C.D. (6 September 1632 Appointed - 5 September 1633 Resigned)
- Bishop Timoteo Pérez Vargas, O.C.D. (5 September 1633 Succeeded - 23 December 1639 Resigned)
- Bishop Jean Duval, O.C.D. (25 September 1638 Appointed - 10 April 1669 Died)
- Bishop Laurent Elias Mouton (Mutton), O.C.D. (8 April 1695 Appointed - 3 November 1708 Died)
- Bishop Barnaba Giovanni Battista Fedele, O.P. (8 June 1716 Appointed - 8 January 1731 Died)
- Bishop Filippo Maria di San Agostino (Camillo Apollonio) Malachisi, O.C.D. (11 August 1732 Appointed - 13 August 1749 Died)
- Bishop Marco Antonio Piacentini, O.C.D. (15 March 1751 Appointed - 22 June 1755 Died)
- Bishop Cornelio di San Giuseppe (Giuseppe) Reina, O.C.D. (2 October 1758 Appointed - May 1797 Died)
  - Archbishop François Lesné (Apostolic Administrator 9 April 1896 – 11 February 1910)

Archbishops

- Archbishop Jacques-Emile Sontag, C.M. (11 July 1910 – 27 July 1918)
- Archbishop Kevin William Barden, O.P. (30 May 1974 – 12 August 1982)
- Archbishop Ignazio Bedini, S.D.B. (2 December 1989 – 2014)
  - Jack Youssef C.M., Apostolic Administrator 2015 - 2021
- Archbishop Dominique Joseph Mathieu, O.F.M. Conv, (8 January 2021 -), cardinal 7 December 2024

== See also ==
- List of Catholic dioceses in Iran

== Sources ==
- GCatholic.org
- Catholic Hierarchy
- (in Italian) Daniele Federico Rosa (a cura di), La delegazione apostolica in Persia dalla creazione al 1936: alcuni cenni storici, Città del Vaticano 2011
