= Toma Audo =

Iraqi archbishop (1854–1918)

- Archbishop of the Eparchy of Urmia
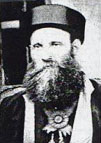
- See: Archeparchy of Urmia
- In office: 1 May 1892—27 Jul 1918
- Predecessor: Pierre Elie XII Abboloyonan
- Successor: Isaac-Jesu-Yab Khoudabache
- Previous post: Priest

Orders
- Ordination: 1880

Personal details
- Born: October 10, 1854 Alqosh
- Died: 27 July 1918 (aged 63) Urmia

Mar Toma Audo (Syriac: ܬܐܘܡܐ ܐܘܕܘ), also spelled Thomas Audo (October 10, 1854 - July 27, 1918) was Archbishop of the Chaldean Catholic Archeparchy of Urmia (1890-1918), within the Chaldean Catholic Church.

== Life ==
He was born on October 10, 1854, in Alqosh to ethnic Assyrian parents. His uncle Joseph Audo, who was the Patriarch of the Chaldean Catholic Church, took him to Rome to study. After completing the studies, he was ordained priest in 1880, and appointed the first Archbishop of the newly created Chaldean Catholic Archeparchy of Urmia on December 3, 1890. He was consecrated on September 4, 1892, and served as diocesan bishop until his assassination during the Assyrian genocide on July 27, 1918.

== Works ==
The main work of Toma Audo was a descriptive dictionary of the Syriac language, in two volumes, the first printed in 1897, The second in 1901, but antedated to the same year as the first volume (1897). The entire content of both volumes was printed in Syriac, using the East Syriac script. The work had a Syriac title (Simtā d-leššānā suryāyā), that translates into English as: Treasure of the Syriac Language, but instead of a proper translation of original title, both volumes were printed under an auxiliary French title: Dictionnaire de la langue Chaldêenne. The distinction between the Syriac designation in the primary title, and the Chaldean designation in the French title later became one of several points of contention related to the work.

First edition:

- Audo, Thomas (1897). Dictionnaire de la langue Chaldêenne (in Syriac). Vol. 1. Mossoul: Imprimerie des pères dominicains.
- Audo, Thomas (1897) [1901]. Dictionnaire de la langue Chaldêenne (in Syriac). Vol. 2. Mossoul: Imprimerie des pères dominicains.

Later editions:

- Audo, Thomas (2008) [1897]. Treasure of the Syriac Language: A Dictionary of Classical Syriac. Vol. 1. Piscataway, NJ: Gorgias Press.
- Audo, Thomas (2008) [1901]. Treasure of the Syriac Language: A Dictionary of Classical Syriac. Vol. 2. Piscataway, NJ: Gorgias Press.

Other works:

- Kalila and Dimna: Fables of Bidpai.

== See also ==
- Addai Scher

== Sources ==
- Kiraz, George A. (2008). "Touma Audo and his lexicon". Treasure of the Syriac Language: A Dictionary of Classical Syriac (PDF). Vol. 1. Piscataway, NJ: Gorgias Press. pp. 3–5.
- Kiraz, George A. (2011). "Audo, Toma". Gorgias Encyclopedic Dictionary of the Syriac Heritage. Piscataway, NJ: Gorgias Press. pp. 47–48.
- Macúch, Rudolf (1976). Geschichte der spät- und neusyrischen Literatur. Berlin-New York: Walter de Gruyter. ISBN 9783110059595.
- Naby, Eden (2016). "Ōdō, Tōmā". Encyclopaedia Iranica.
- Oussani, Gabriel (1901). "The Modern Chaldeans and Nestorians, and the Study of Syriac among Them". Journal of the American Oriental Society. 22: 79–96. doi:10.2307/592420. JSTOR 592420.
