= St. Mary's Cathedral, Urmia =

St. Mary's Cathedral
- کلیسای جامع سنت مری
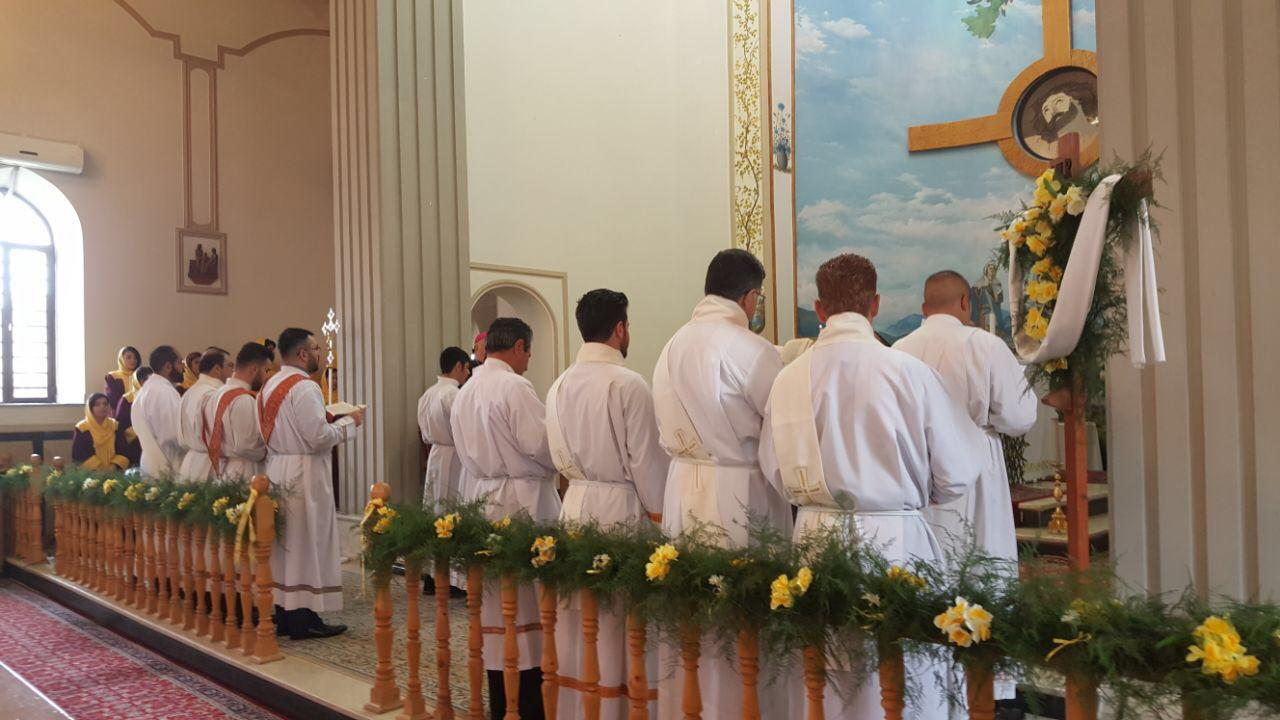
- St. Mary's Cathedral
- Location: Urmia
- Country: Iran
- Denomination: Catholic church (Chaldean rite)

The St. Mary's Cathedral (Persian: کلیسای جامع سنت مری ) also called Cathedral of St. Mary the Mother of God is a Chaldean religious building of the Catholic church that follows the Chaldean rite and is located in Mehdi Al Ghadam, Mirzaian Street of the city of Urmía in West Azerbaijan province, north of Iran and near the border with Turkey.

It is a temple that follows the Chaldean or East Syriac Rite and is one of the 4 Chaldean Catholic cathedrals operating in Iran. The church serves as the seat of the Chaldean Catholic Archeparchie of Urmia, suffragan of the Chaldean Catholic diocese of Salmas.

Its construction dates from the period between 1881 and 1885; it was destroyed in 1918 and reopened in 1954. It is under the pastoral responsibility of the Chaldean Archbishop Thomas Meram.

== See also ==
- Roman Catholicism in Iran
- St. Mary Church, Urmia
