= St. Nerses Church =

Iranian national heritage site

Saint Nerses Church of New Julfa
- Location within Iran

Religion
- Affiliation: Armenian Apostolic Church
- Rite: Armenian
- Status: Functioning

Location
- Location: New Julfa, Isfahan, Iran
- Coordinates: 32.63043925°N 51.64953679°E

Architecture
- Style: Isfahani
- Completed: 1666

Saint Nerses the Great Church of New Julfa, (Armenian: Նոր Ջուղայի Սուրբ Ներսես Մեծ Եկեղեցի, Persian: کلیسای نرسس مقدس), is an Armenian Apostolic church in New Julfa, Iran. It is located in Kocher neighbourhood of New Julfa, next to the Catholic Church of Our Lady of the Rosary.

== History ==
Saint Minas Church was built in 1666 by Avetis Gilanian. After devotion of relic of St. Nerses to this church, it was renamed to St. Nerses Church. The church belfry was built in 1889. There are several tombstones in the courtyard, including 11 belonging Georgians with Armenian and Georgian inscriptions.

== See also ==
- Iranian Armenians
- List of Armenian churches in Iran
