= Chaldean Catholic Archeparchy of Ahvaz =

Eastern Catholic archeparchy in Iran

Coordinates: 31.3167°N 48.6833°E

Archeparchy of Ahvaz Ahvasiensis Chaldaeorum

Location
- Country: Iran
- Metropolitan: Patriarchate of Baghdad
- Headquarters: Ahvaz, Khuzestan province, Iran

Statistics
- Population: (as of 2022); 25
- Parishes: 1

Information
- Denomination: Chaldean Catholic Church
- Sui iuris church: Chaldean Catholic Church
- Rite: East Syriac Rite
- Established: 3 January 1966; 60 years ago
- Cathedral: Surp Mesrob Cathedral, in Ahvaz

Current leadership
- Pope: Leo XIV
- Patriarch: Paul III Nona
- Archeparch: Sede vacante
- Apostolic Administrator: Ramzi Garmou, Ist. del Prado

The Chaldean Catholic Archeparchy of Ahvaz (or Ahwaz)(informally called Ahvaz of the Chaldeans) is a non-Metropolitan archeparchy (Eastern Catholic archdiocese) of the particular Chaldean Catholic Church sui iuris (Syro-Oriental Rite in Syriac language) in Ahvaz, Khuzestan Province, southwest Iran.

It is directly dependent on the Chaldean Catholic Patriarch of Babylon, not part of any ecclesiastical province.

Its cathedral archiepiscopal see is Surp Mesrob Church, in Ahvaz.

== History ==
It was established on 3 January 1966, on territory split off from the Metropolitan Archeparchy of Sehna (now Teheran).

== Episcopal ordinaries ==
(all Chaldean Rite)

- Thomas Michel Bidawid (6 January 1966 – 24 August 1970), appointed (Arch)Eparch, Auxiliary of Baghdad
- Samuel Chauriz, O.A.O.C. (18 January 1972 – 1 May 1974), appointed Archeparch of Urmiā
- Hanna Zora (1 May 1974 – 10 June 2011), appointed (Arch)Eparch of Mar Addai of Toronto
  - Patriarchal Administrator Ramzi Garmou, Ist. del Prado (2001 – Present), Archeparch Emeritus of Amida

== See also ==
- Catholic Church in Iran
- Chaldean Catholic Church
