= Chaldean Catholic Archeparchy of Urmia =

Eastern Catholic archeparchy in Iran

Archeparchy of Urmiā Urmiensis

Location
- Country: Iran
- Headquarters: Urmia, West Azerbaijan province, Iran

Statistics
- Population: Total; Catholics: 4,000,000 (1970); 1,000 (2023)
- Parishes: 4

Information
- Denomination: Chaldean Catholic Church
- Sui iuris church: Chaldean Catholic Church
- Rite: East Syriac Rite
- Established: 4 September 1890; 136 years ago
- Cathedral: St. Mary's Cathedral, Urmia

Current leadership
- Archeparch: Sede vacante
- Apostolic Administrator: Imad Khoshaba Gargees (Patriarchal Administrator)
- Bishops emeritus: Thomas Meram

The Chaldean Catholic Archeparchy of Urmiā (also spelled Urmia or called Rezayeh; informally called Urmyā of the Chaldeans) is a metropolitan archeparchy (Eastern Catholic archdiocese) of the Chaldean Catholic Church (Syro-Oriental Rite in Syriac language) with episcopal see in Urmia, West Azerbaijan Province, north-west Iran.

Its cathedral archiepiscopal see is the Cathedral of St. Mary the Mother of God, in Urmia, Iran.

== History ==
Established on 4 September 1890 as the Metropolitan Archeparchy (archdiocese) of Urmyā, on territory previously without proper Ordinary for the rite's particular church sui iuris.

== Province ==
Its ecclesiastical province comprises the Metropolitan's own archeparchy and a single suffragan, the Chaldean Catholic Eparchy of Salmas. Currently, they are both maintained by the same Bishop, and population data for the suffragan are put down under the Archeparchy of Urmia. In effect, the Eparchy of Salmas is part of the Archeparchy of Urmia.

== Episcopal ordinaries ==
(all Chaldean Rite)

Metropolitan Archeparchs of Urmyā

- Tommaso Audo (3 December 1890 – 27 July 1918)
- Isaac-Jesu-Yab Khoudabache (25 October 1930 – 8 August 1939)
- Abel Zaya, C.M. (6 December 1939 – 18 March 1951)
- Zaya Dachtou (14 July 1951 – 15 August 1972)
- Samuel Chauriz, O.A.O.C. (1 May 1974 – 14 June 1981)
- Thomas Meram (30 November 1983 – 6 January 2024), retired
  - Patriarchal Administrator Imad Khoshaba Gargees (6 January 2024 – Present), Archeparch of Tehran

== Statistics ==
In 1913 the diocese had 43 qashe (priests), 13 churches and 7,800 civilians according to Joseph Tfinkdji.

Chaldean communities in the archdiocese of Urmia, 1913

Name of Village	Name in Syriac	Number of Believers	Number of Priests	Number of Churches	Name of Village	Name in Syriac	Number of Believers	Number of Priests	Number of Churches
Urmi	ܐܘܪܡܝܐ	500	18	2	Bardishok		80	1	0
Gulpashan		600	3	1	Eshnuq		200	1	0
Chahargushi		500	1	1	Mawana		300	2	0
Gugtapah		700	3	2	Shimshajeyan		320	1	0
Ardishai		330	1	1	Naqada		180	0	0
Daralik		450	2	1	Babarud		120	0	1
Diza		350	1	1	Anhar		270	1	0
Digala		400	1	1	Chaharbahsh		200	0	0
'Ada		700	3	1	Nazi		300	1	0
Supurghan		350	2	1	Other villages		800	0	0
Taka		150	1	0	Total		7,800	43	13

== See also ==
- Catholic Church in Iran
- Chaldean Catholic Church
