= Catholic Church of Tabriz =

- کلیسا عذرای توانا
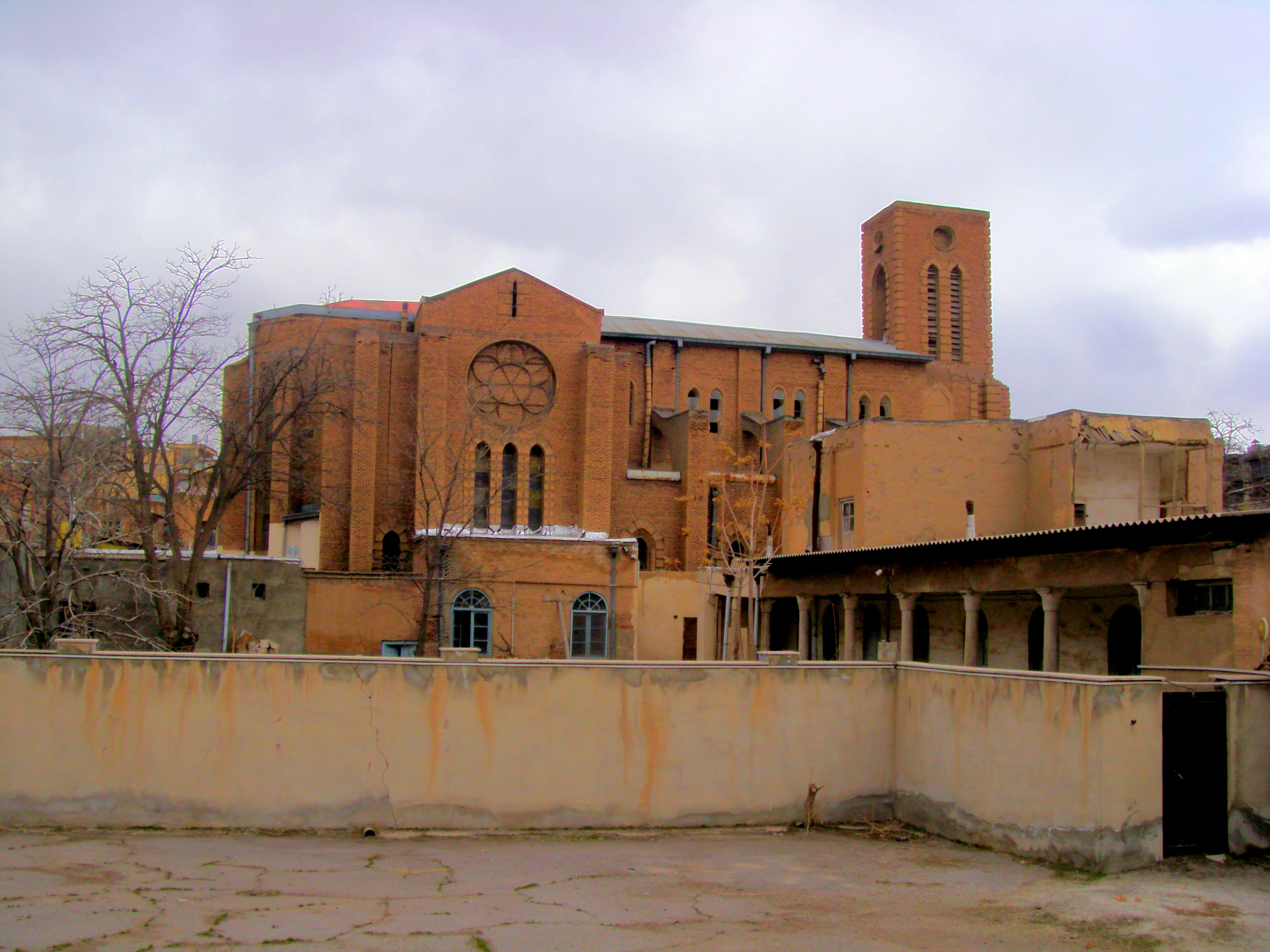
- Saint Mary Church.

- Location within Iran

Religion
- Affiliation: Catholic Church

Location
- Location: Tabriz, Iran
- Coordinates: 38.07544346°N 46.2859717°E

Architecture
- Groundbreaking: 1912

The Catholic Church (Mighty Ezra) belongs to Iran's Catholic Christian community. It was built during the Qajar dynasty in 1912 and is located in the Mearmear of Tabriz. The church, built with a brick facade, measures 30 metres high by 15 metres wide with the bell tower located on a small balcony.

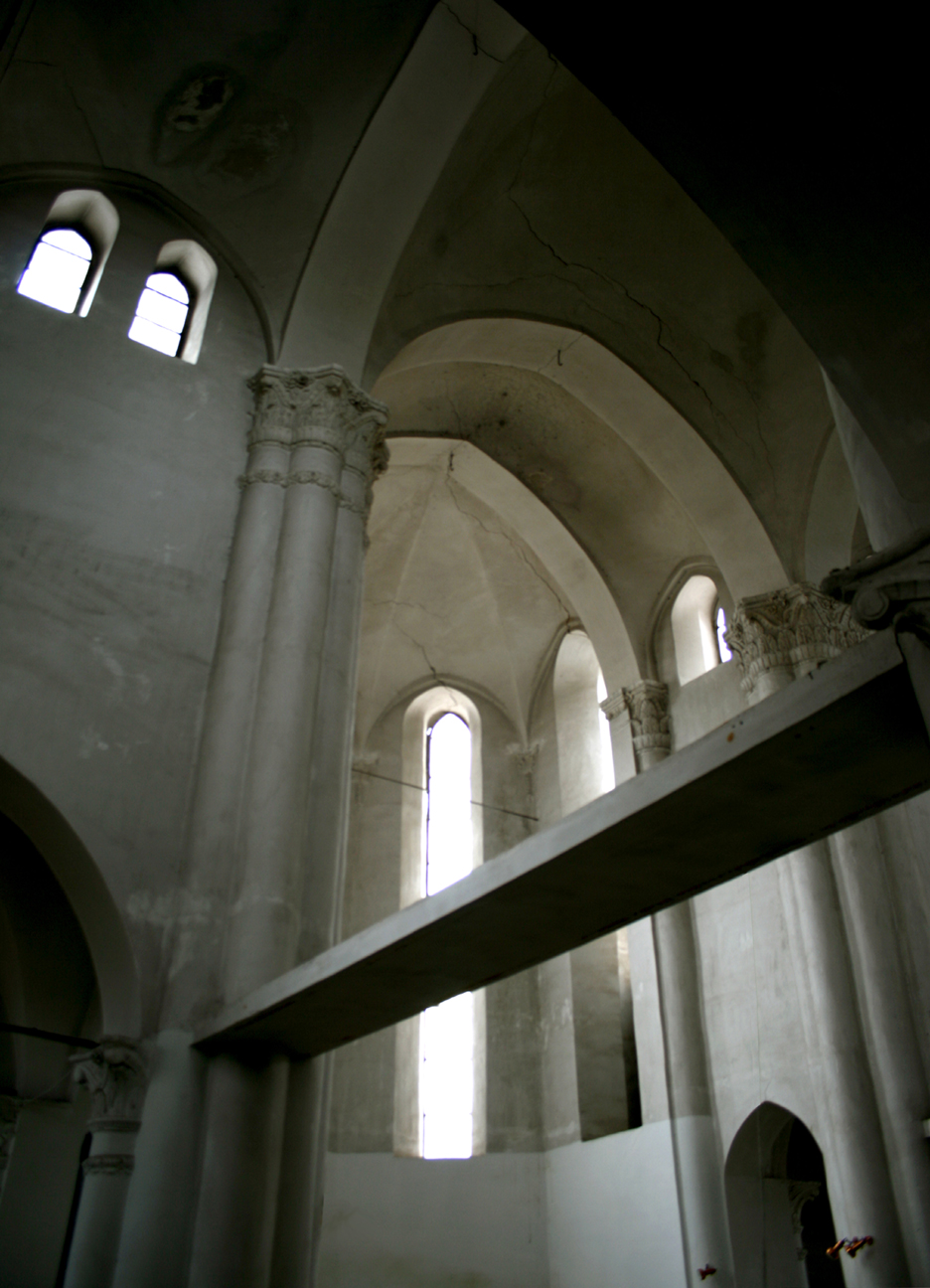
Interior of catholic church of Tabriz.
