= Abidar Open Air Cinema =

Coordinates: 35.30868°N 46.97438°E

Abidar Open Air Cinema (Persian: سینمای روباز آبیدر) an outdoor cinema, was built in 1995 over the Amireih valley in Sanandaj, capital city of Kurdistan Province, Iran. There used to show a movie every Friday.

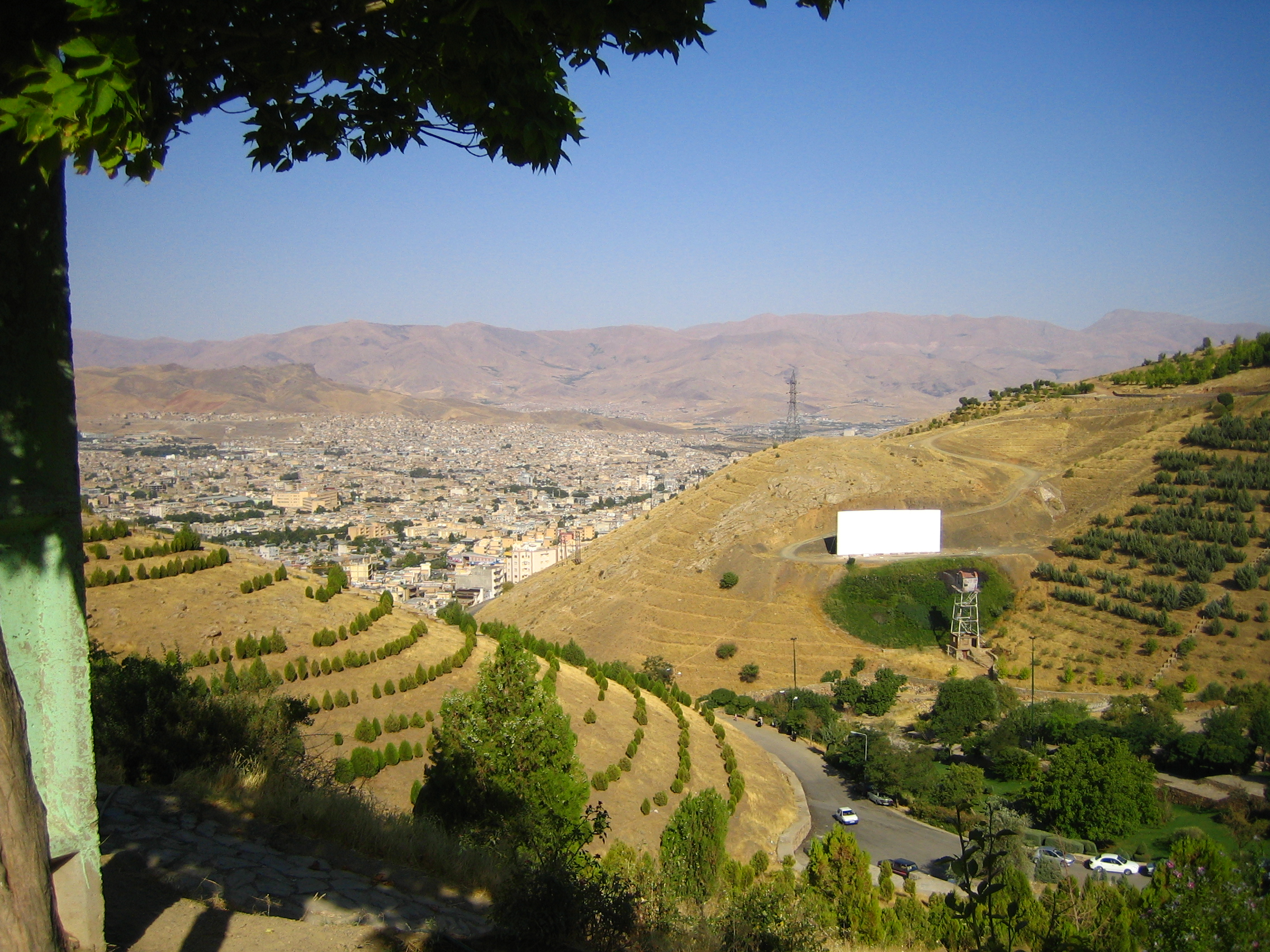
Abidar outdoor Cinema-Sanandaj
