= Ramzi Garmou =

Ramzi Garmou Ist. del Prado
- Archeparch of Amida
- Church: Persian And Chaldean Catholic Church
- Archdiocese: Archeparchy of Amida
- In office: 22 December 2018 – 2022
- Predecessor: Paul Karatas
- Successor: Sabri Anar
- Other post: Administrator of Ahvaz (since 2001)
- Previous posts: Patriarchal Administrator of Tehran (2018-2022); Archeparch of Tehran (1999-2018); Coadjutor Archeparch of Tehran (1995-1999)

Orders
- Ordination: 13 January 1977
- Consecration: 25 February 1996 by Raphael I Bidawid

Personal details
- Born: 5 February 1945 Zakho, Hashemite Kingdom of Iraq

Ramzi Garmou (born in Zakho, Iraq on 5 February 1945), was the Assyro-Chaldean Catholic archbishop of Tehran on the Assyro-Chaldean Catholic Metropolitan Archdiocese of Tehran.

Garmou was consecrated a priest on 13 January 1977 and joined the Eparchy of Tehran. On 5 May 1995, he was appointed by Pope John Paul II as co-adjutor bishop of Tehran. His episcopal ordination was on the hands of The Chaldean Patriarch of Babylon Raphael I Bidawid aided by Archbishop of Tehran, Youhannan Semaan Issayi and by the Archbishop of Urmia Thomas Meram on 25 February 1996.

On 7 February 1999, Ramzi Garmou succeeded Youhannan Semaan Issayi as Assyro-Chaldean Archbishop of Tehran upon the latter's death.

In 2019, he became Archbishop of Diarbekir (Amida) (Chaldean), Turkey. He lives in Istanbul.

On November 10, 2023, Imad Khoshabeh replaced him as Archbishop of Tehran.

Preceded by Youhannan Semaan Issayi	Archbishop of Tehran (Chaldean), Iran; 1999–present	Succeeded by Imad Khoshabeh
