= Youhannan Semaan Issayi =

Iranian metropolitan bishop

- Archeparch of Tehran
- Native name: یوحنا عیسایی
- Church: Chaldean Catholic Church
- Archdiocese: Archeparchy of Tehran
- In office: 7 March 1970 – 7 February 1999
- Predecessor: Joseph Cheikho
- Successor: Ramzi Garmou
- Previous posts: Titular Archeparch of Hieropolis (1967-1970); Coadjutor Archeparch of Sehna (1967-1970)

Orders
- Ordination: 3 March 1940
- Consecration: 22 October 1967 by Joseph Cheikho

Personal details
- Born: 27 June 1914 Sanandaj, Kurdistan, Sublime State of Iran
- Died: 7 February 1999 (aged 84)

Mar Youhannan Semaan Issayi (27 June 1914 (یوحنا سمعان عیسائی) - 7 February 1999)) was the Metropolitan Archbishop of Tehran of the Chaldean Catholics from March 16, 1971 until his death in 1999. He was born in Sanandaj, Kurdistan, Iran, ordained priest on March 3, 1940, and consecrated bishop on October 22, 1967, in Iran.

== Additional titles ==
- Coadjutor Archbishop of Sehna of the Chaldeans (Iran): (1 September 1967 – 7 March 1970)
- Titular Archbishop of Hieropolis: (1 September 1967 – 7 March 1970)
- Metropolitan Archbishop of Sehna of the Chaldeans (Iran): (7 March 1970 – 16 March 1971)

== Education ==
Issayi attended the Chaldean Seminary in Mosul for the formation and left for Rome in 1933. He attended the Pontifical Urbaniana University, where he earned a master's degree in both philosophy and theology. He, then, pursued doctoral studies and obtained his Ph.D. During his academic career, he learned 8 languages: the classic Syriac, Colloquial Syriac (Modern Assyrian), Persian, Arabic, English, French, Italian, Latin, and Kurdish.

== Priesthood life ==
He was ordained as a priest in 1940 and elevated to the rank of Archbishop on October 22, 1967. Issayi served the Assyro-Chaldean Catholic Congregation at Tehran, Hamadan, Kermanshah, Qazvin, and Sanandaj for almost 50 years. He supervised several construction projects of the churches, schools, and other charity institutions affiliated to the Assyro-Chaldean Catholic Church at Tehran Diocese.

== Writer and translator ==
Translation of Eastern Rite Mass book from Aramaic into Modern Colloquial Syriac. A writer of extensively religious or Historic issues in modern Assyrian including an unpublished comprehensive Syriac Dictionary. The writer of different religious books for Assyro-Chaldean students from elementary to high school levels. Mar Youhannan was editor of the church's periodicals named Marga and Payam published in Persian and modern Assyro-Chaldean. Mar Youhannan published a poetry book devoted to the Virgin Mary and besides of his clergy services, he was a professor of Aramaic and Assyrian language.

== Hymnist ==
Mar Youhannan composed many Assyro-Chaldean hymns (music & lyric) for the Christmas Mass, Good Friday, and Easter Mass. These hymns were harmonized in polyphonic by Maestro Paulus Khofri and have been performed by church choirs worldwide.

Preceded by Joseph Cheikho	Archbishop of Tehran (Chaldean), Iran; 1970–2019	Succeeded by Ramzi Garmou
