= Chaldean Catholic Archeparchy of Tehran =

Eastern Catholic archeparchy in Iran

Coordinates: 35.7000°N 51.4167°E

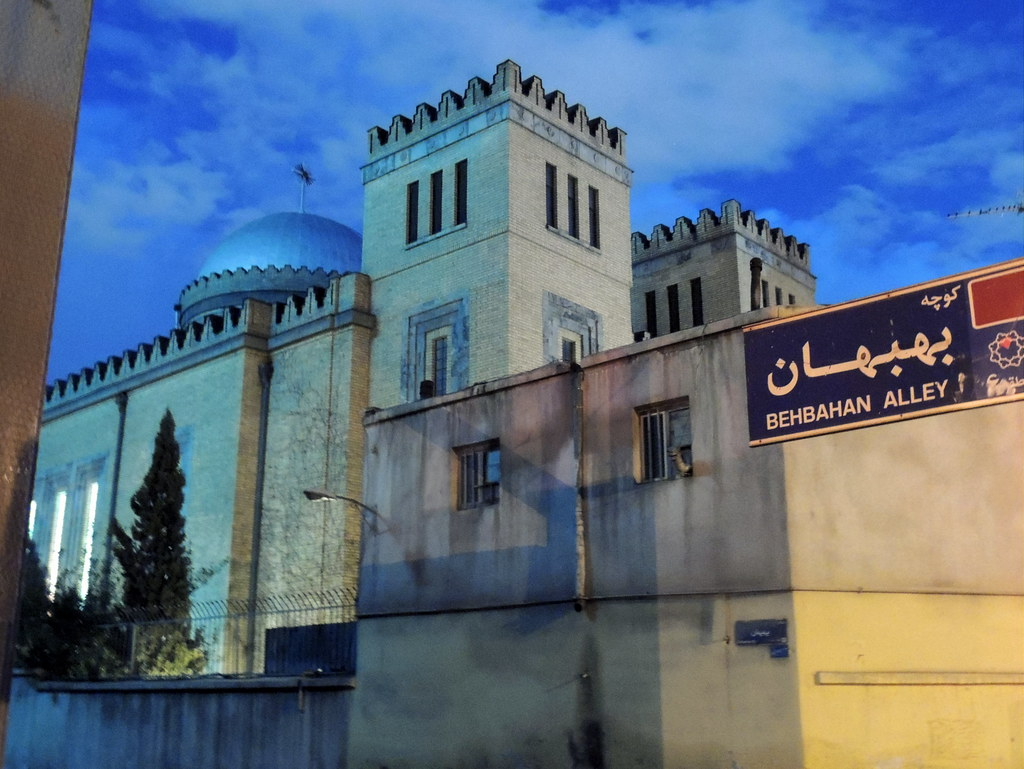
St. Joseph's Cathedral, Tehran.

The Chaldean Catholic Metropolitan Archeparchy of Tehran (Latin: Archidioecesis Teheranensis Chaldaeorum) is an Archeparchy (Eastern Archdiocese) of the Chaldean Catholic church (Syro-Oriental Rite) in Iran, with its archiepiscopal see, St. Joseph's Cathedral, in the national capital Tehran. Despite its Metropolitan rank, it has no suffragan.

== History ==
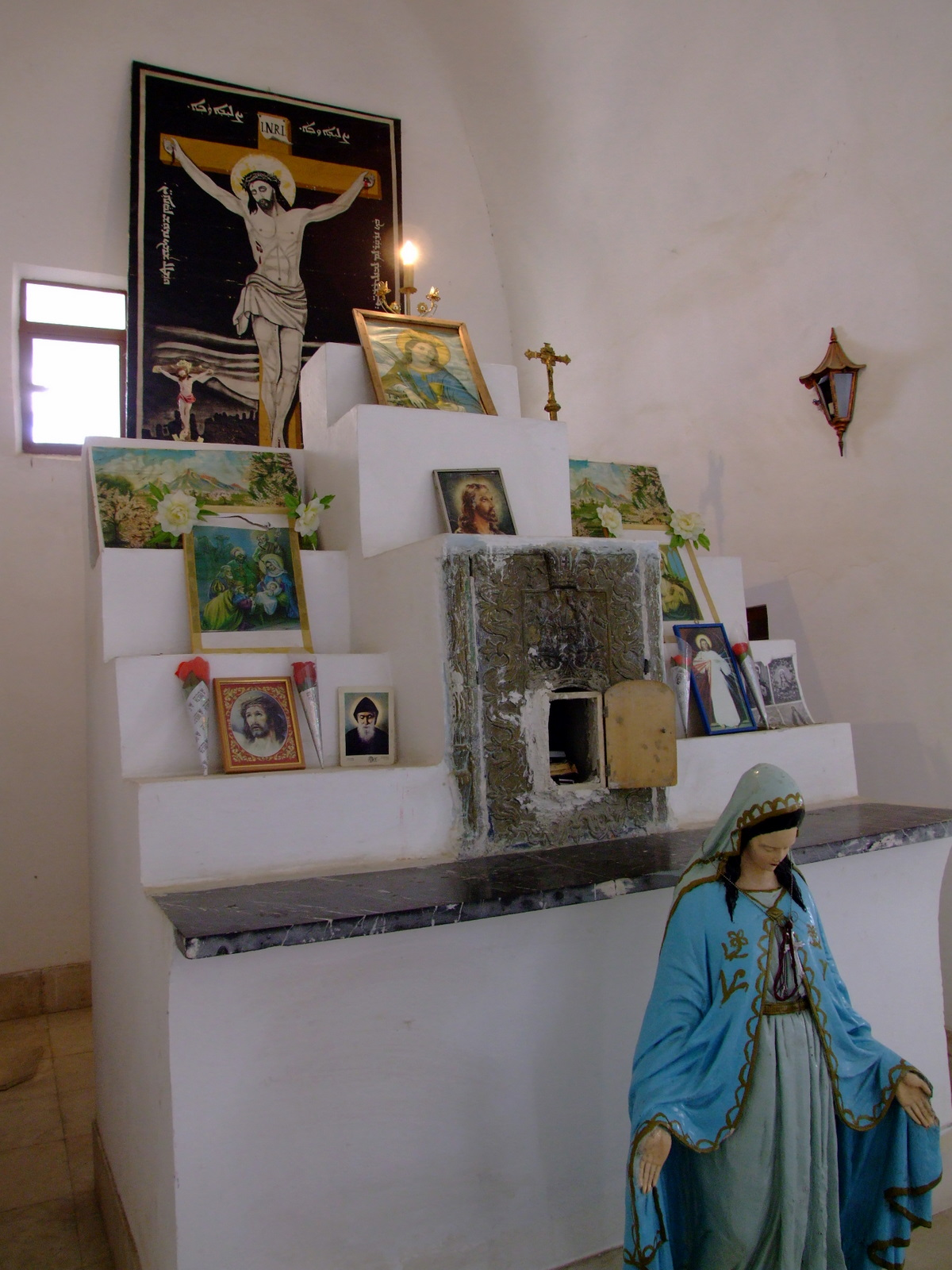
Chaldean Catholic church in Sanandaj.

The archeparchy was established in 1853 in the city of Sanandaj (Sehna, Sinna), Iran for the Iranian Christians in and around Senaya, on territory split off from the Metropolitan Chaldean Catholic Archdiocese of Kirkuk (in Iraqi Kurdistan).

In 1944, the archdiocese moved its headquarters to Tehran, the capital of Iran.

On 3 January 1966, it lost territory to establish the non-Metropolitan Chaldean Catholic Archeparchy of Ahvaz, also in Iran.

The Assyrian community of Sanandaj gradually migrated to Tehran from 1960 to 1968, lived in the same district of Agha Zaman (now Namak), and frequently visits Sanandaj as their birthplace. There are still some Assyrian houses from the early 1900s intact and in use today.

It enjoyed a papal visit from Pope Paul VI in November 1970.

On 16 March 1971, the Chaldean Catholic Archdiocese of Sehna was renamed the Archdiocese of Tehran.

== Metropolitan Archeparchs (archbishops) ==
Metropolitan Archeparchs of Sehna (Sanandaj, Sinna)

- Girolamo Shimun Kashat † (ordained Bishop on 7 September 1857)
- Youhanna Nissan† (12 May 1914 – 20 April 1937)
- Abraham Elias, C.M. † (appointed 6 September 1938 – died 15 February 1940)
- Yosep Sheikho † (appointed 22 May 1944 – retired 7 Mar 1970)
- Zaia Datchou (between 1960 and 1970s)

Metropolitan Archbishops of Tehran

- Youhanna Semaan Issayi † (succeeded 7 Mar 1970 – died 7 Feb 1999)
- Ramzi Garmou (succeeded 7 Feb 1999 – ), also Patriarchal Administrator of Ahvaz of the Chaldeans (Iran) and Apostolic Visitor of the Chaldean Catholics in Europe (where they have no proper ordinary).

== Diocesan properties ==
- Mart Maryam Church, located in the Aqa Zaman district (turned into historical building)
- Sharif Abad Garden (Amiryeh Park) located at Abidar mountain
- Public Bath located in the Aqa Zaman district (now Namak district)

The Pahlavi School, built in 1916 in the Aqa Zaman district, is no longer there as it has been destroyed for a main street in recent development.

== Source and External links ==
- GigaCatholic, with incumbent biography links
