= Urmia =

City in West Azerbaijan province, Iran

Urmia ارومیه (Persian)
- City
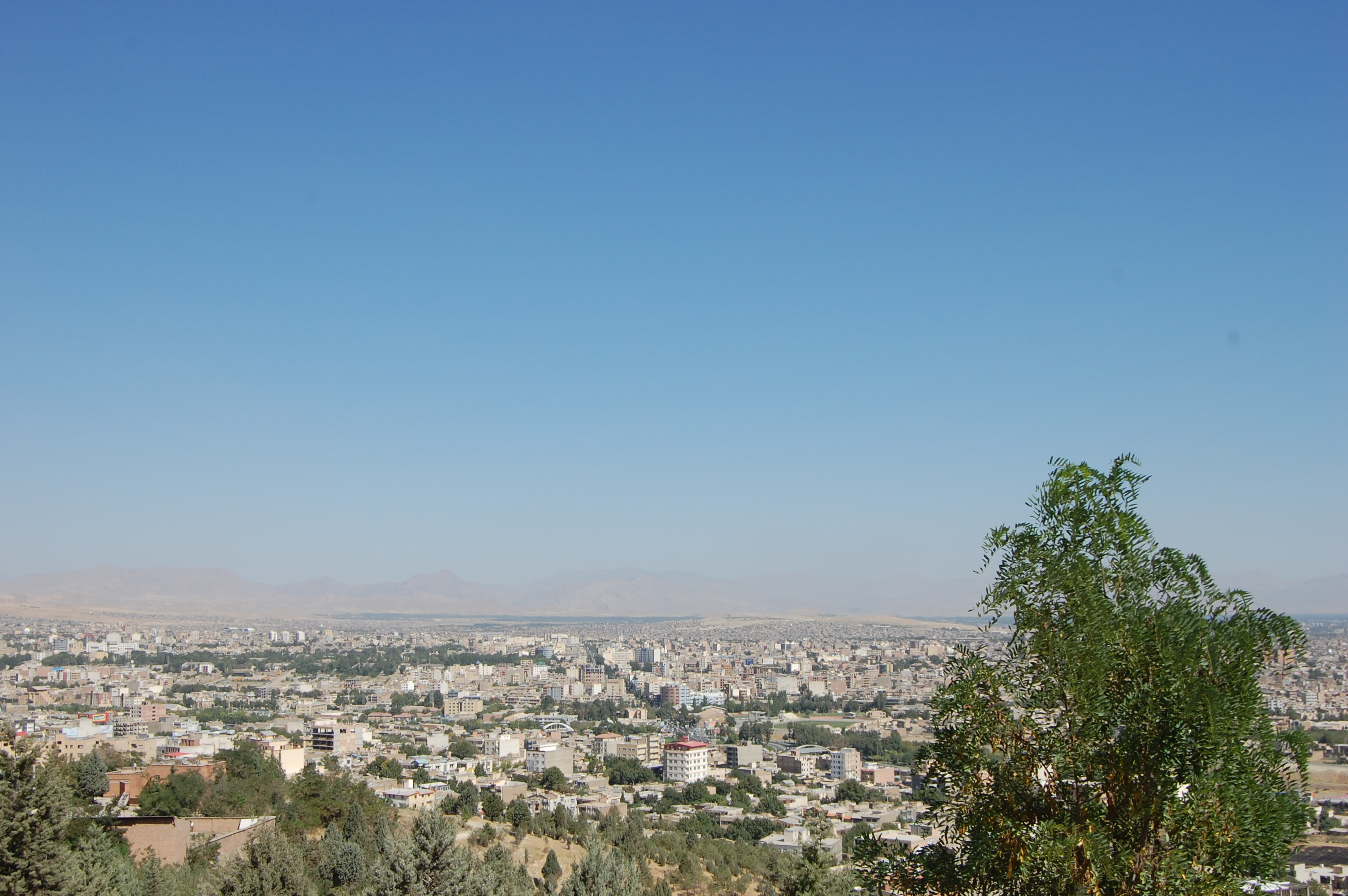
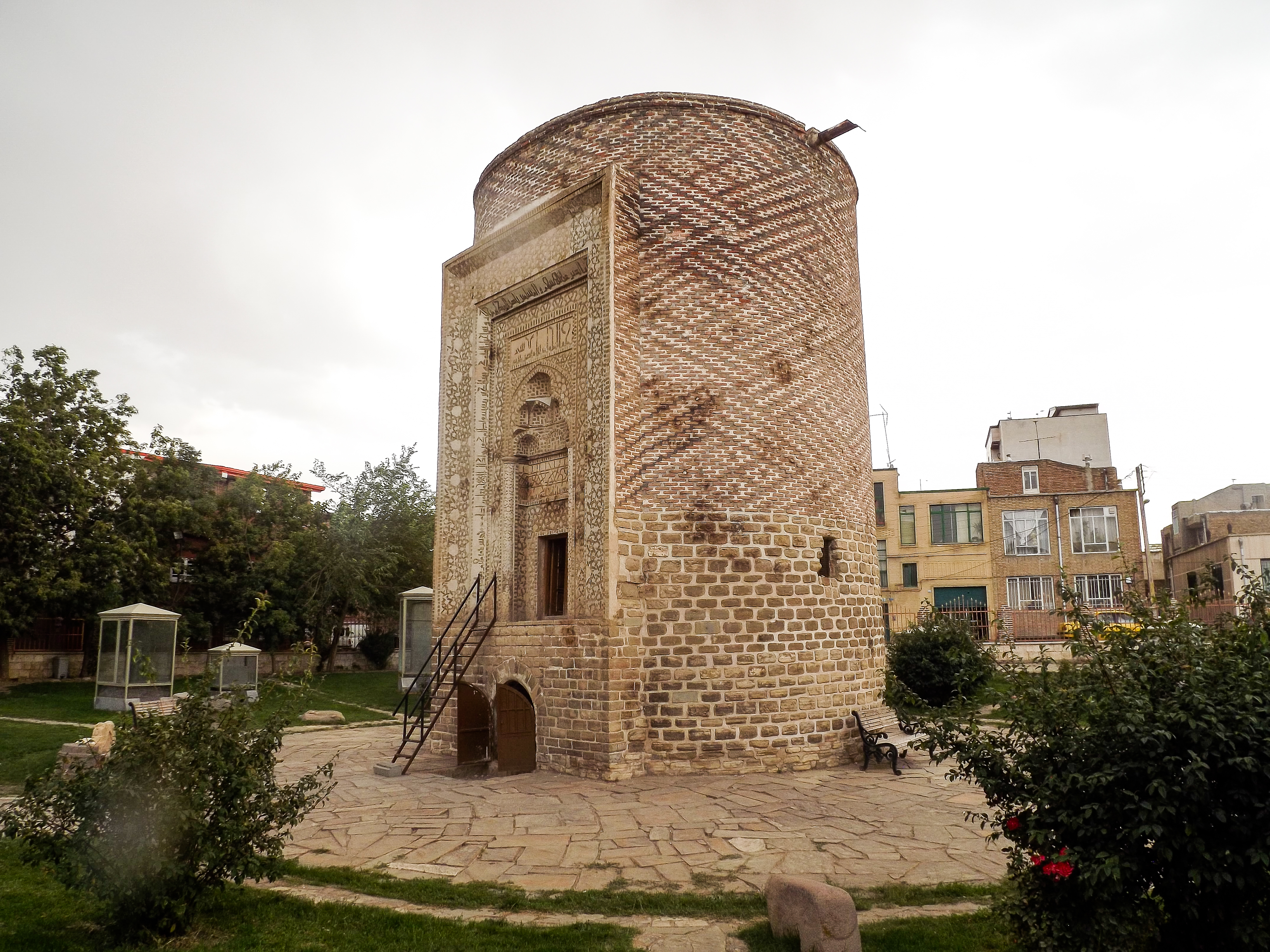
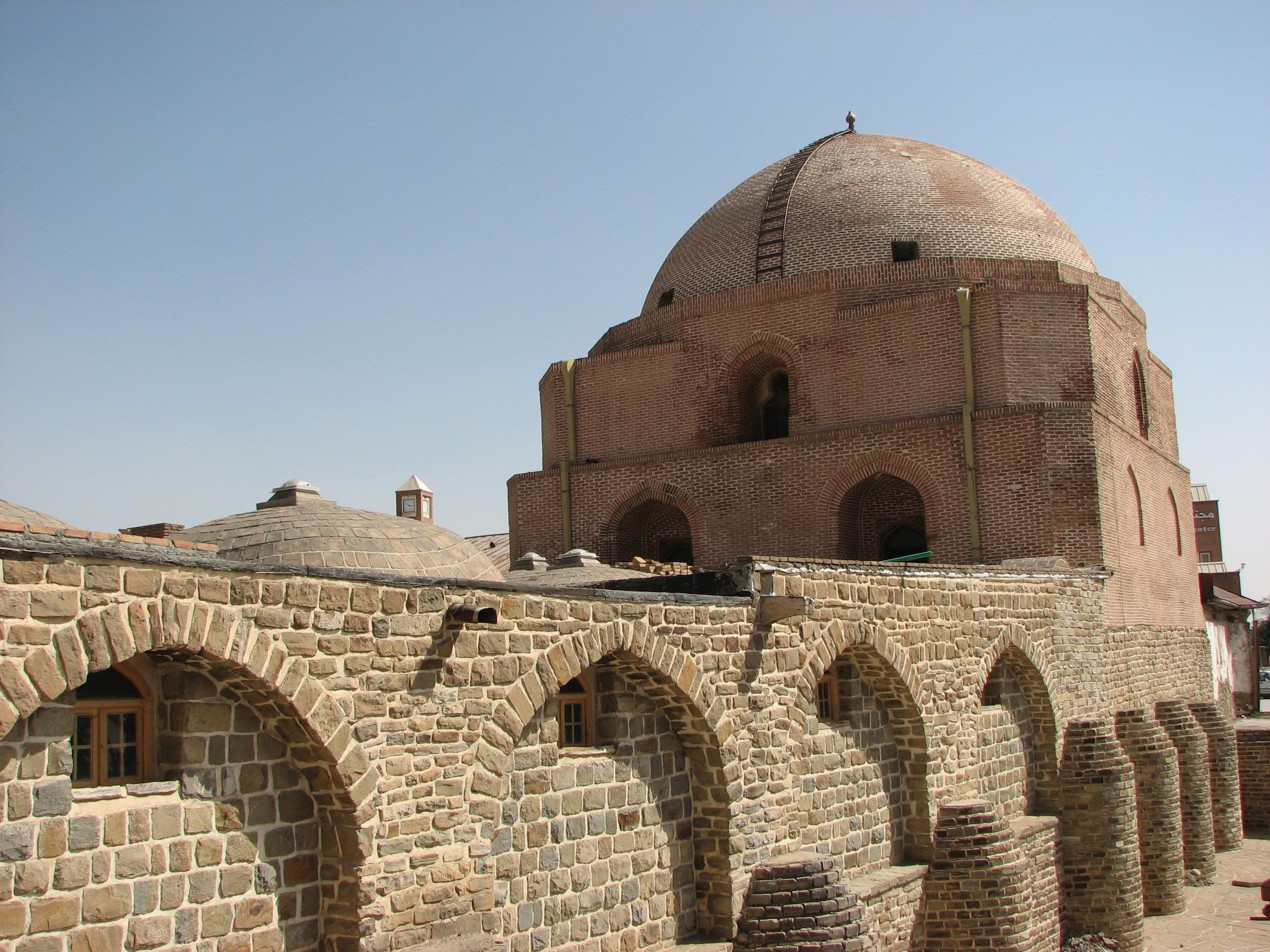
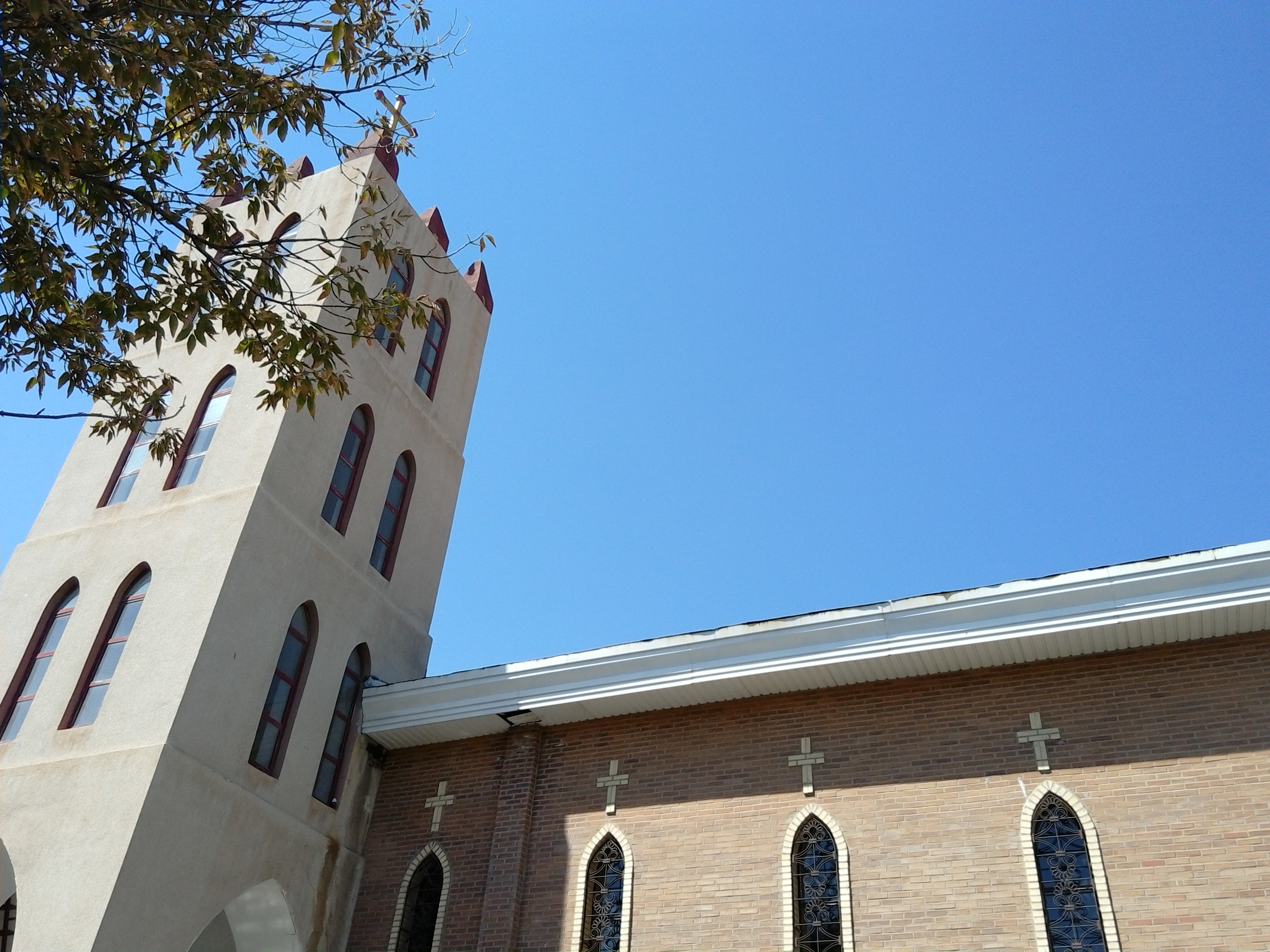
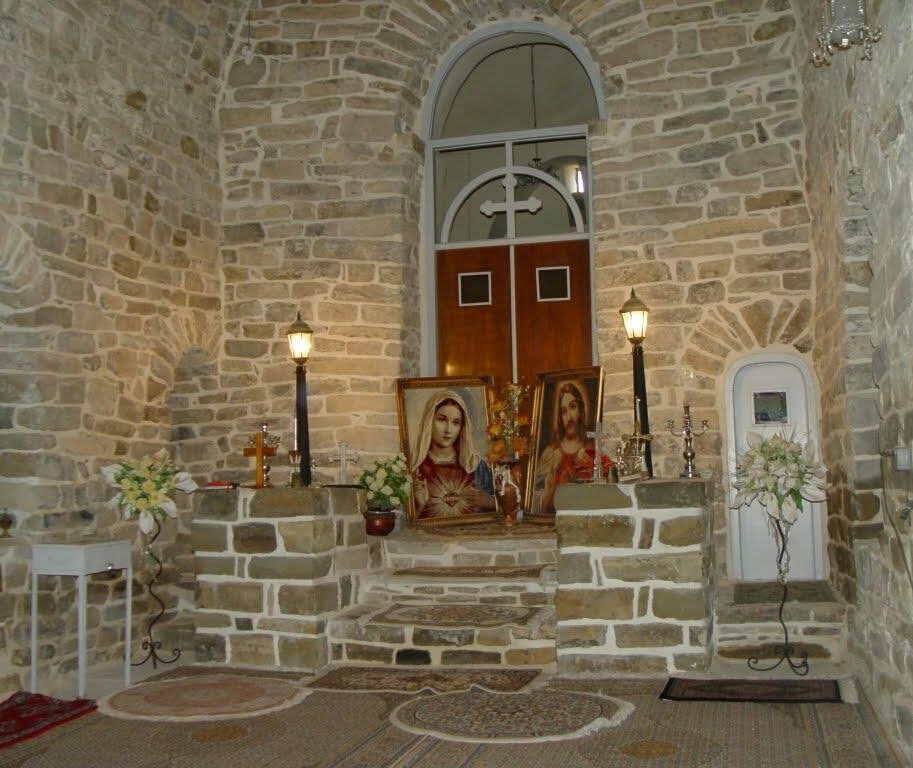
- Clockwise from top: Skyline of the city, Jameh Mosque of Urmia, St. Sarkis Church, St. Mary Church, Segonbad

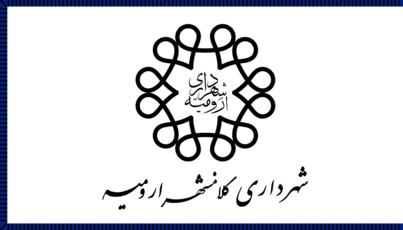
- Flag Seal
- Interactive map of Urmia
- Location within Iran
- Coordinates: 37°32′38″N 45°03′53″E
- Country: Iran
- Region: 3
- Province: West Azerbaijan
- County: Urmia
- Bakhsh: Central

Government
  - Mayor: Hossein Mahdizadeh
  - Parliament: Vahid Jalalzadeh, Salman Zaker & Ruhollah Hazratpour
- Elevation: 1,332 m (4,370 ft)

Population (2016 census)
  - Urban: 736,224
  - Metro: 1,000,000
  - Population Rank in Iran: 10th
- Time zone: UTC+3:30 (IRST)
- Area code: 044
- Website: urmia.city

Urmia (Persian: ارومیه; pronounced [oɾumiˈje]) (Note: Also romanized as Orumiyeh, Oroumieh, Oroumiyeh, Orūmīyeh and Urūmiyeh) is the largest city in West Azerbaijan Province of Iran. In the Central District of Urmia County, it is capital of the province, the county, and the district. The city is situated near the borders of Iran with Turkey and Iraq.

The city lies at an elevation of 1,330 metres (4,360 ft) above sea level along the Shahar River on the Urmia Plain. Lake Urmia, one of the world's largest salt lakes, lies to the east of the city, and the border with Turkey lies to the west.

The city is the trading center for a fertile agricultural region where fruits (especially apples and grapes) and tobacco are grown. Among the villages in the Urmia region are Lajani and Mafaran. Even though the majority of the residents of Urmia are Muslims, the Christian history of Urmia is well preserved and is especially evident in the city's many churches and cathedrals.

An important town by the 9th century, the city has had a diverse population which has at times included Muslims (Shias and Sunnis), Christians (Catholics, Protestants, Nestorians, and Orthodox), Jews, Baháʼís and Sufis. Around 1900, Christians made up more than 40% of the city's population; however, in the next decades most of the Christians were either killed by the advancing Ottoman troops or in raids by Kurdish tribes or fled shortly after the end of the war.

Urmia, Takab and Piranshahr respectively have the highest number of registered provincial sites in the list of national sites.

Urmia is a historically diverse city where Azerbaijanis, Kurds, Persians, Assyrians, and Armenians have long lived side by side. It has also been home to Jewish and Baháʼí communities, reflecting its longstanding multicultural and multireligious character.

== Etymology ==
Richard Nelson Frye suggested Urartian origin for the name, while T. Burrow connected the origin of the name Urmia to Indo-Iranian urmi- "wave" and urmya- "undulating, wavy".

The name could also derive from the combination of the Assyrian Aramaic words Ur (ܐܘܪ; a common name for cities around Mesopotamia, meaning "city") and Mia (Syriac: ܡܝܐ, lit. 'water'), "City of Water" referring to the great Lake Urmia nearby. Compare Urhay, Ur of the Chaldees.

=== Variants and alternatives ===
As of 1921, Urmia was also called, Urumia and Urmi. During the Pahlavi era (1925–1979), the city was called Rezaiyeh (Persian: رضائیه) (Note: Also romanized as Rezaeyeh, Rezā’īyeh, and Rezâiyye) after Reza Shah, the Pahlavi dynasty's founder, whose name ultimately derives from the Islamic concept of rida via the Eighth Imam in Twelver Shia Islam, Ali al-Ridha.

In his seyahatname, Evliya Çelebi referred to the city as Rûmiyye (Ottoman Turkish: رومیه), also mentioning that the Mongols called the city Urumiye (Ottoman Turkish: اورمیه), Persians Rûmiyye-i Kübrâ (Ottoman Turkish: رومیه كبری), and some historians Türkistân-ı İrân (Ottoman Turkish: تركستان ایران), which he justified by the considerable amount of Turkoman awliya in the city.

Due to the city's contact with many ethnic groups and cultures throughout its history, the name of the city has many linguistic variants:

- Persian: ارومیه, pronounced [oɾumiˈje]
- Armenian: Ուրմիա, romanized: Urmia
- Azerbaijani: اورمیه, romanized: Urmiya, or اورمو, Urmu
- Kurmanji Kurdish: ئورمیە, romanized: Ûrmiye
- Sorani Kurdish: ورمێ, romanized: Wirmê
- Syriac: ܐܘܪܡܝܐ, romanized: Urmia

== History ==
=== Early history ===
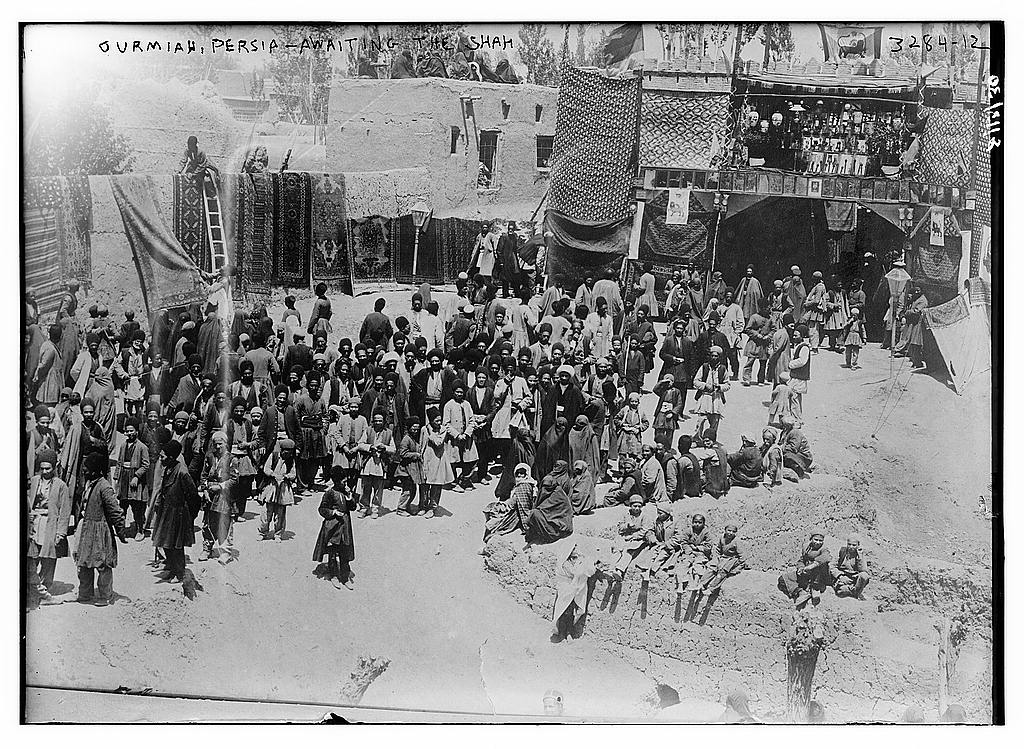
People of Urmia awaiting Ahmad Shah Qajar, 1911

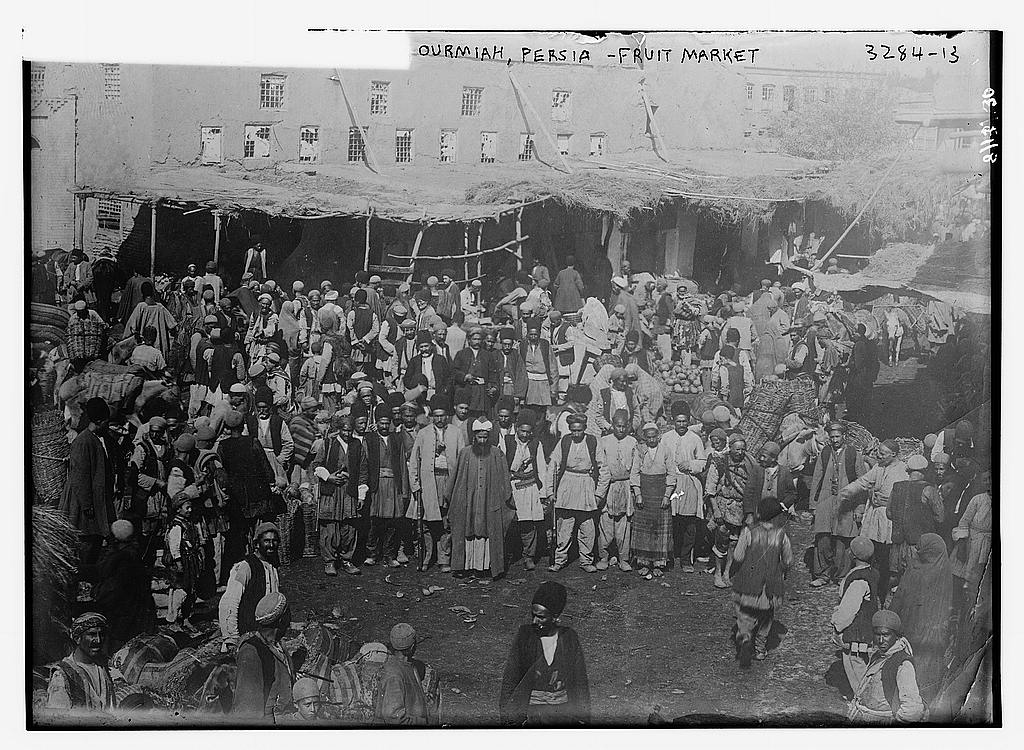
Urmia fruit market, 1911

According to Vladimir Minorsky, there were villages in the Urmia Plain as early as 2000 BC, with their civilization under the influence of the Kingdom of Van. Excavations of the ancient ruins near Urmia led to the discovery of utensils that date to the 20th century BC. In ancient times, the west bank of Urmia Lake was part of Gilzan, and in the 9th century BC an independent government ruled there, which later joined the Urartu or Manna empire; in the 8th century BC, the area was a vassal of the Asuzh government until it joined the Median kingdom.

Assyrians who did survive the invasion of Baghdad by Timur fled through northern Iraq up into the Hakkari Mountains to the west of Lake Urmia and the area remained as their homeland until the 19th century.

During the Safavid era, the neighboring Ottoman Empire, who were the archrivals of the Safavids, made several incursions into the city and captured it on more than one occasion, but the Safavids successfully regained control over the area. When in 1622, during the reign of the Safavid Shah Abbas the Great (r. 1588–1629), Qasem Sultan Afshar was appointed governor of Mosul, he was forced to leave his office shortly afterwards due to the outbreak of a plague. He moved to the western part of Azerbaijan, and became the founder of the Afshar community of Urmia. The city was the capital of the Urmia Khanate from 1747 to 1865. The first monarch of Iran's Qajar dynasty, Agha Mohammad Khan, was crowned in Urmia in 1795.

=== 19th century ===
Due to the presence of a substantial Christian minority at the end of the 19th century, Urmia was also chosen as the site of the first Christian missionaries from the United States in Iran in 1835 led by Justin Perkins (1805–1869) with Asahel Grant (1807–1844); and followed by Fidelia Fiske (1816–1864), Joseph Gallup Cochran (1817–1871), and Joseph Plumb Cochran (1855–1905). Another mission was soon underway in nearby Tabriz as well. During World War I, the population was estimated by Dr. Caujole to be 30,000 people, a quarter of which (7,500) were Assyrians and 1,000 Jews.

During the 19th century, the region became the center of a short-lived Assyrian renaissance with many books and newspapers being published in Syriac. Urmia was also the seat of a Chaldean diocese.

=== 20th century ===
In late 1914, Ottoman forces under the command of Enver Pasha stepped up clandestine activity in the region with the aim of committing the Ottoman Empire to war. During World War I, the city changed hands several times between the Russians and the Ottoman troops and their Kurdish allies in the following two years. In 1914, before the declaration of war against Russia, Ottoman forces crossed the border into Qajar Iran and destroyed Christian villages. Large-scale attacks in late September and October 1914 targeted many Assyrian villages, and the attackers neared Urmia. Due to Ottoman attacks, thousands of Christians living along the border fled to Urmia.

Many Christians fled during the Russian withdrawal from Azerbaijan at the beginning of January 1915, and 20,000 to 25,000 refugees were left stranded in Urmia. Nearly 18,000 Christians sought shelter in the city's Presbyterian and Lazarist missions. Although there was reluctance to attack the missionary compounds, many died of disease. Between February and May (when the Ottoman forces pulled out), there was a campaign of mass execution, looting, kidnapping, and extortion against Christians in Urmia. More than 100 men were arrested at the Lazarist compound, and dozens (including Mar Dinkha, bishop of Tergawer) were executed on 23 and 24 February.

The Russian army advanced later in 1915. After Russia's withdrawal as a result of the 1917 Russian Revolution, about 5,000 Assyrian and Armenian militia policed the area, but they frequently abused their power and killed Muslims without provocation.

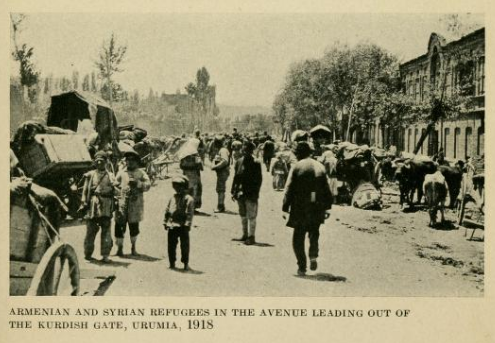
Armenian and Assyrian refugees in the avenue leading out of the Kurdish Gate, Urmia, July 1918

From February to July 1918, the region was engulfed by ethnic violence. On 22 February, local Muslims and the Iranian governor began an uprising against the Christian militias in Urmia. The better-organized Christians, led by Agha Petros, brutally crushed the uprising; hundreds (possibly thousands) were killed. On 16 March, Mar Shimun and many of his bodyguards were killed by the Kurdish chieftain Simko Shikak, probably at the instigation of Iranian officials fearing Assyrian separatism, after they met to discuss an alliance. Assyrians went on a killing and looting spree; unable to find Simko, they murdered Iranian officials and inhabitants. The Kurds responded by massacring Christians, regardless of denomination or ethnicity. Christians were massacred in Salmas in June and in Urmia in early July, and many Assyrian women were abducted.

Christian militias in Azerbaijan were no match for the Ottoman army when it invaded in July 1918. Tens of thousands of Ottoman and Iranian Assyrians fled south to Hamadan, where the British Dunsterforce was garrisoned, on 18 July to escape Ottoman forces approaching Urmia under Ali İhsan Sâbis. The Ottoman invasion was followed by killings of Christians, including Chaldean archbishop Toma Audo, and the sacking of Urmia.

=== 21st century ===
On 22 March 2025, large-scale demonstrations were held in the city. Slogans against Kurdistan were chanted during the demonstrations. Anadolu Agency reported that there was ethnic tension between Turks and Kurds in the city and that Turks were protesting the Nowruz celebrations held by Kurds living in the city a few days ago. Some protesters stated that the Iranian government was trying to change the demographics by bringing Kurds to the city. It was reported that those who participated in the demonstration chanted Turkish slogans such as "Urumiyah is Turkish and will remain Turkish" and "Urumiyah's Turkish identity is not negotiable". 2 days after the protest, 22 people were arrested.

== Demographics ==
=== Ethnic composition ===
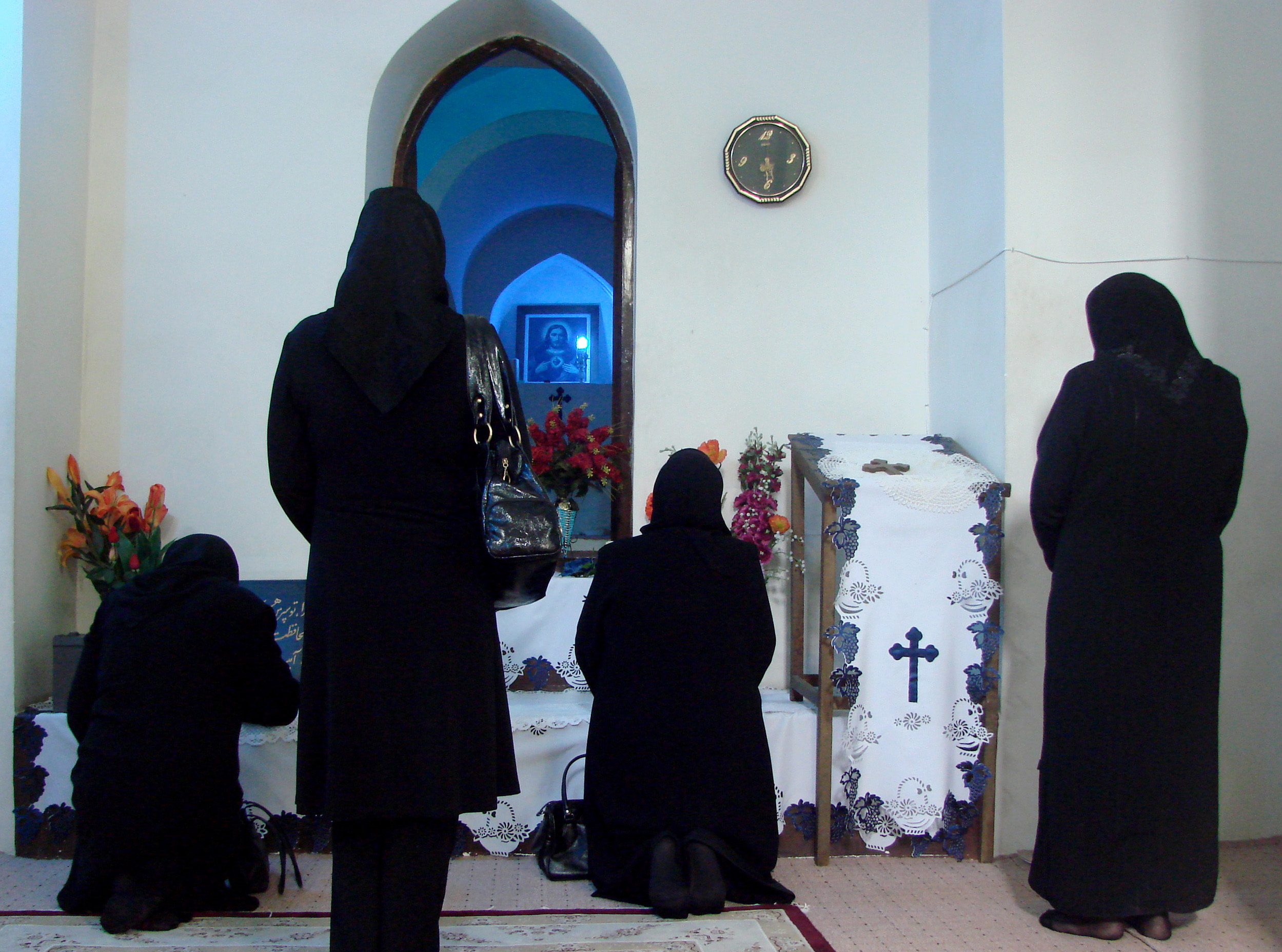
Assyrian Christian women praying in Mart Maryam Church in Urmia, Iran.

The city has been home to various ethnic groups during its history. In late 19th century, George Curzon reported a population of 30 to 40 thousand people, chiefly Afshars, Kurds, Nestorians, Jews, and Armenians, while other sources also referred to an additional Persian community. At the beginning of the 20th century, the city had a significant Christian minority (Assyrians and Armenians). According to Macuch, and Ishaya, the city was the spiritual capital of the Assyrians, who were influenced by four Christian missions that had been established in the city in the period from 1830 to the end of World War I. A large number of the Assyrians and Armenians were killed in 1914 during the Armenian and Assyrian genocides, which resulted in a change in the city's demographics. In the fourteenth edition of Encyclopædia Britannica from 1929, the town's population was roughly estimated to be 45 thousand before the war, mainly being Turkish with Armenian and Nestorian minorities. During the era of Reza Shah Pahlavi, Iranian Assyrians were invited to return to the region, and several thousand did return. There are around 5,000 Assyrians remaining in the city.

Until the Iran crisis of 1946 and the Establishment of the State of Israel in 1947, several thousand Jews also lived Urmia, and their language (Lishán Didán) is still spoken by an ageing community in Israel.

According to the Federal Research Division of Library of Congress, ethnic Azeris form around 40% of the population of Urmia region. The majority of the city's residents are Azerbaijanis, with a large minority of Kurds, and a smaller number of Assyrians, and Armenians, as well as Persian-speakers who moved to the city mostly for employment.

The majority of the population can speak the official language of Iran, Persian, in addition to their own native tongue.

=== Religion ===
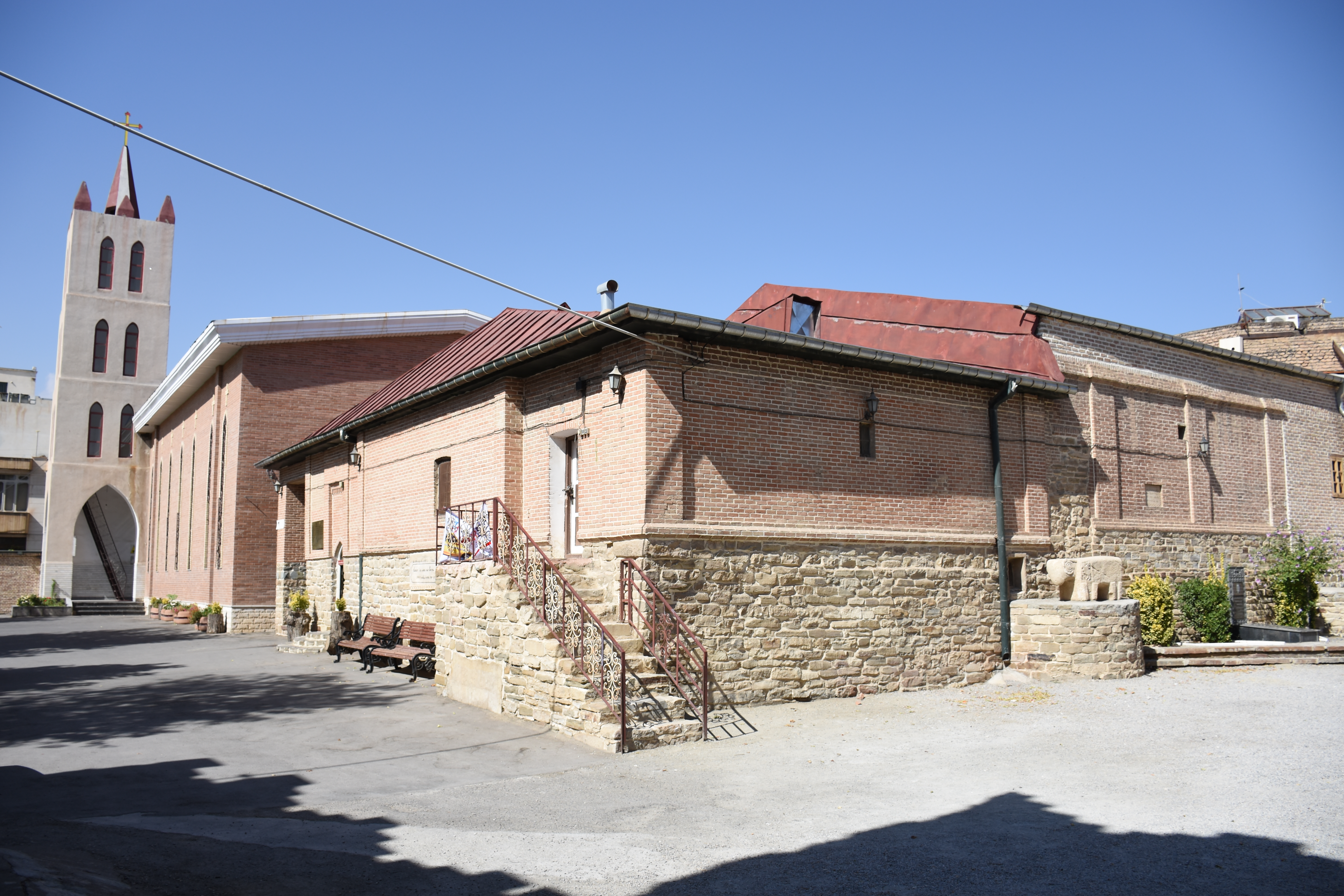
Saint Mary Church: an ancient Assyrian church located in the city of Urmia.

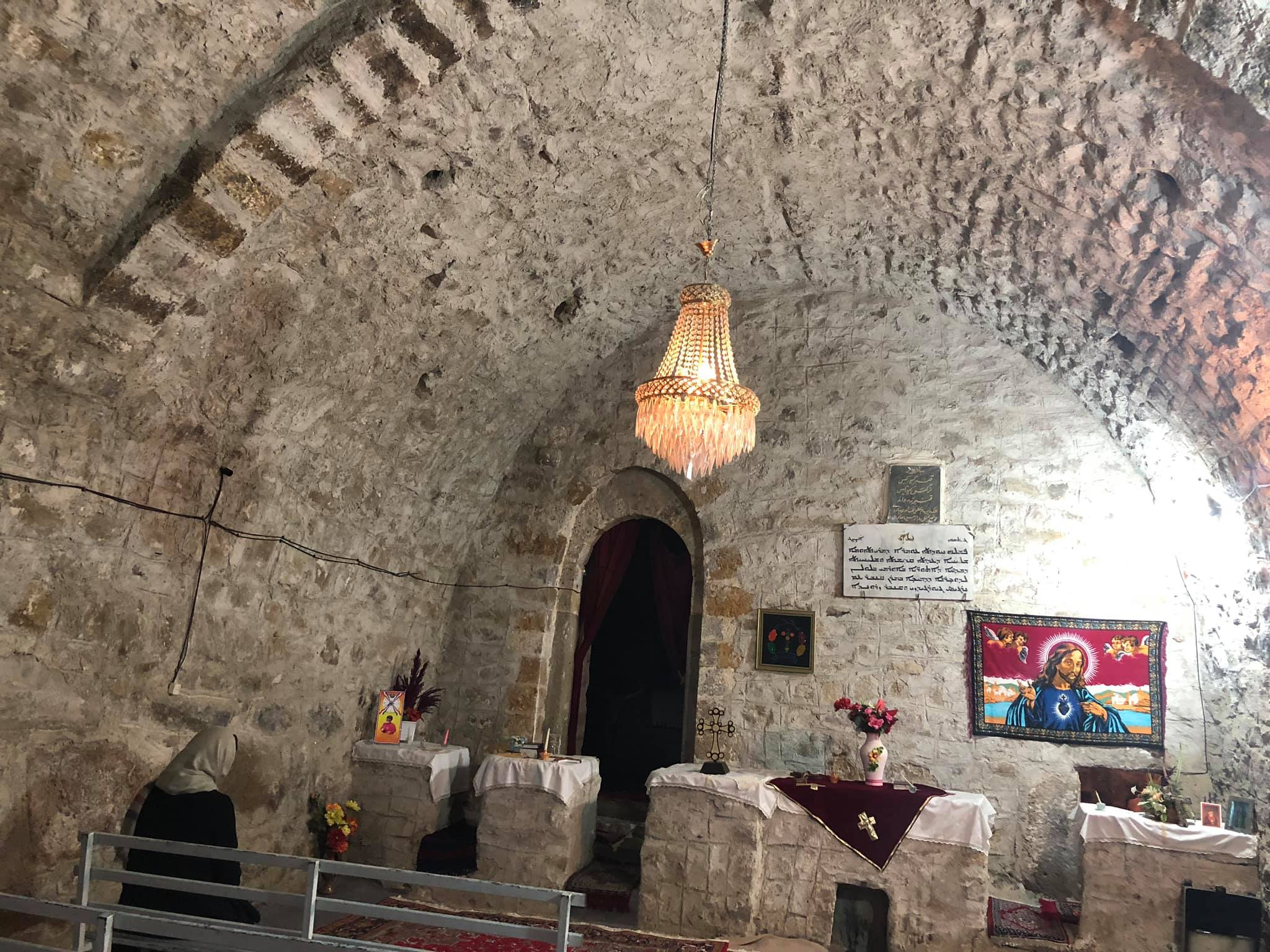
Mar Toma church near Urmia.

The city is the archiepiscopal see of the Eastern Catholic Metropolitan Chaldean Catholic Archeparchy of Urmyā, which has a suffragan in Salmas. There are also Protestants, Church of the East adherents and Armenian Orthodox. There are four churches in the central part of the city, two being Assyrian Church of the East, one Armenian, and one Chaldean.

When 17th-century explorer Evliya Çelebi visited the region, the city's Muslim population was mostly Sunni and not yet converted to Shia Islam. Around 1900, Christians made up more than 40% of the city's population; however, most of the Christians were either killed when the Ottoman Empire invaded Qajar Iran and committed genocide against Urmia's Assyrian and Armenian population or fled shortly after the end of the war. Approximately 15,000 Assyrians reside in northern Iran, in Urmia and various Assyrian villages in the surrounding area. The Christian history of Urmia is well preserved and is especially evident in the city's many churches and cathedrals.

Historical Population
Year	Pop.	±%
1956	67,705	—
1966	110,749	+63.6%
1976	164,419	+48.5%
1986	300,746	+82.9%
1991	357,399	+18.8%
1996	435,200	+21.8%
2006	577,307	+32.7%
2011	667,499	+15.6%
2016	736,224	+10.3%

=== Population ===
Urmia is the 10th-most populous city in Iran. At the time of the 2006 National Census, the city's population was 577,307 in 153,570 households. The following census in 2011 counted 667,499 people in 197,749 households. The 2016 census measured the population of the city as 736,224 people in 225,050 households.

== Parks and touristic centres ==
The tourist attractions in the city of Urmia include many parks and coastal villages located or near the shores of Lake Urmia. The oldest park in Urmia, called Park-e Saat, was established during the early Pahlavi era. Urmia's largest park is Ellar Bagi Park (Azerbaijani "People's Garden") along the Shahar Chayi, or the "City River".

Lakes and ponds

- Urmia Lake Natural Park
- Hasanloo Lake
- Marmisho lake
- Shahrchay ِDam
- Urmia Lake Islands

Lagoons

- Haft Abad
- Soole Dokel
- Dana Boğan
- Ali Pancesi
- Isti Sou

Parks

- Park-e Saat (Clock Park)
- Park-e Jangali (Jungle Park)
- Ellar Bagi (People's Garden)
- Park-e Shahr (City Park)
- Park-e Saheli (Riverside Park)
- Park-e Shaghayegh
- Alghadir Park
- Tokhmemorghi (Oval) Park
- Ghaem Park

Scenic coastal villages:

- Chichest
- Bari
- Fanoos
- Sier
- Band
- Khoshako

Landscape attractions:

- Qasimlu Valley
- Kazem Dashi Islet in Lake Urmia
- Kashtiban Village
- Imamzada Village
- Silvana Region
- Rashekan to Dash Aghol
- Nazloo
- Dalamper
- Kaboodan Island

== Climate ==
Urmia's climate is cold semi-arid climate (Köppen: BSk, Trewartha: BS), bordering on humid continental climate (Köppen: Dsa, Trewartha: Dc), with cold winters, mild springs, hot dry summers, and cool autumns. Precipitation is heavily concentrated in late autumn, winter (mostly in the form of snow), and especially spring, while precipitation is scarce in summer. Temperatures in Urmia are much colder than most of the remainder of Iran. The drought of Urmia Lake will have a negative impact on the climate of the region.

Being on the downwind and rain shadow side of the Zagros Mountains, its winters are relatively drier and less snowy than Hakkari's (to the west) in southeastern Turkey due to the foehn effect.

Climate data for Urmia (Orumiyeh) 1991-2020, extremes 1961-2020
Month	Jan	Feb	Mar	Apr	May	Jun	Jul	Aug	Sep	Oct	Nov	Dec	Year
Record high °C (°F)	16.4 (61.5)	19.8 (67.6)	26.0 (78.8)	30.8 (87.4)	32.0 (89.6)	37.0 (98.6)	39.9 (103.8)	39.2 (102.6)	36.2 (97.2)	30.0 (86.0)	22.8 (73.0)	21.4 (70.5)	39.9 (103.8)
Mean daily maximum °C (°F)	3.6 (38.5)	6.6 (43.9)	12.0 (53.6)	17.7 (63.9)	22.8 (73.0)	28.4 (83.1)	31.5 (88.7)	31.4 (88.5)	27.3 (81.1)	20.5 (68.9)	12.0 (53.6)	5.8 (42.4)	18.3 (64.9)
Daily mean °C (°F)	−1.8 (28.8)	0.7 (33.3)	5.9 (42.6)	11.3 (52.3)	16.0 (60.8)	21.2 (70.2)	24.2 (75.6)	23.6 (74.5)	19.1 (66.4)	12.8 (55.0)	5.6 (42.1)	0.3 (32.5)	11.6 (52.8)
Mean daily minimum °C (°F)	−6.4 (20.5)	−4.6 (23.7)	−0.2 (31.6)	4.4 (39.9)	8.4 (47.1)	12.5 (54.5)	15.8 (60.4)	15.0 (59.0)	10.4 (50.7)	5.7 (42.3)	0.3 (32.5)	−4.2 (24.4)	4.8 (40.6)
Record low °C (°F)	−22.8 (−9.0)	−22 (−8)	−19 (−2)	−12 (10)	−1.8 (28.8)	3.9 (39.0)	8.4 (47.1)	7.8 (46.0)	2.2 (36.0)	−5 (23)	−13.4 (7.9)	−20 (−4)	−22.8 (−9.0)
Average precipitation mm (inches)	27.4 (1.08)	28.6 (1.13)	44.2 (1.74)	59.4 (2.34)	38.8 (1.53)	9.0 (0.35)	5.1 (0.20)	2.6 (0.10)	4.4 (0.17)	24.3 (0.96)	40.5 (1.59)	28.5 (1.12)	312.8 (12.31)
Average precipitation days (≥ 1.0 mm)	4.8	4.3	6.1	7.2	6.8	2.0	0.7	0.6	1.0	3.5	5.3	5.0	47.3
Average snowy days	8.5	7.5	3.7	0.8	0.0	0.0	0.0	0.0	0.0	0.3	1.5	5.5	27.8
Average relative humidity (%)	74	68	59	57	56	47	46	46	48	58	70	75	58.7
Average dew point °C (°F)	−6.1 (21.0)	−5.1 (22.8)	−2.3 (27.9)	2.0 (35.6)	6.1 (43.0)	8.3 (46.9)	10.8 (51.4)	10.1 (50.2)	6.7 (44.1)	3.9 (39.0)	0.0 (32.0)	−3.9 (25.0)	2.5 (36.6)
Mean monthly sunshine hours	142	172	203	227	285	353	369	353	306	237	175	136	2,958
Source: NOAA (snow days 1961-1990)(extremes from both)

== Sport ==
Sports are an important part of Urmia's culture. The most popular sport in Urmia is volleyball. Urmia is considered Iran's volleyball capital, and that is because of the ranks that Shahrdari Urmia VC got in Iranian Volleyball Super League and for the great volleyball players who play on the Iran men's national volleyball team (such as Saed Marouf, Abdolreza Alizadeh, and Milad Ebadipour) and first-class coaches in Iran. Recently, Urmia has also been called "the city of volleyball lovers" by the Fédération Internationale de Volleyball (International Volleyball Federation, FIVB) official website.

The 2010 Asian Men's Cup Volleyball Championship was held in Ghadir Arena in Urmia, 2012 WAFF Futsal Championship, and the 2012 Asian Junior Men's Volleyball Championship was also held in Urmia. It is also one of the venues of the 2019 FIVB Volleyball Men's Nations League.

== Culture ==
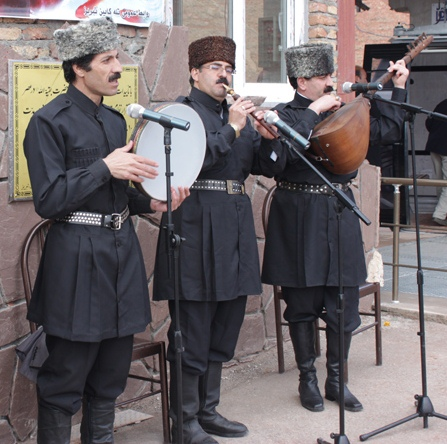
An Ashik music group

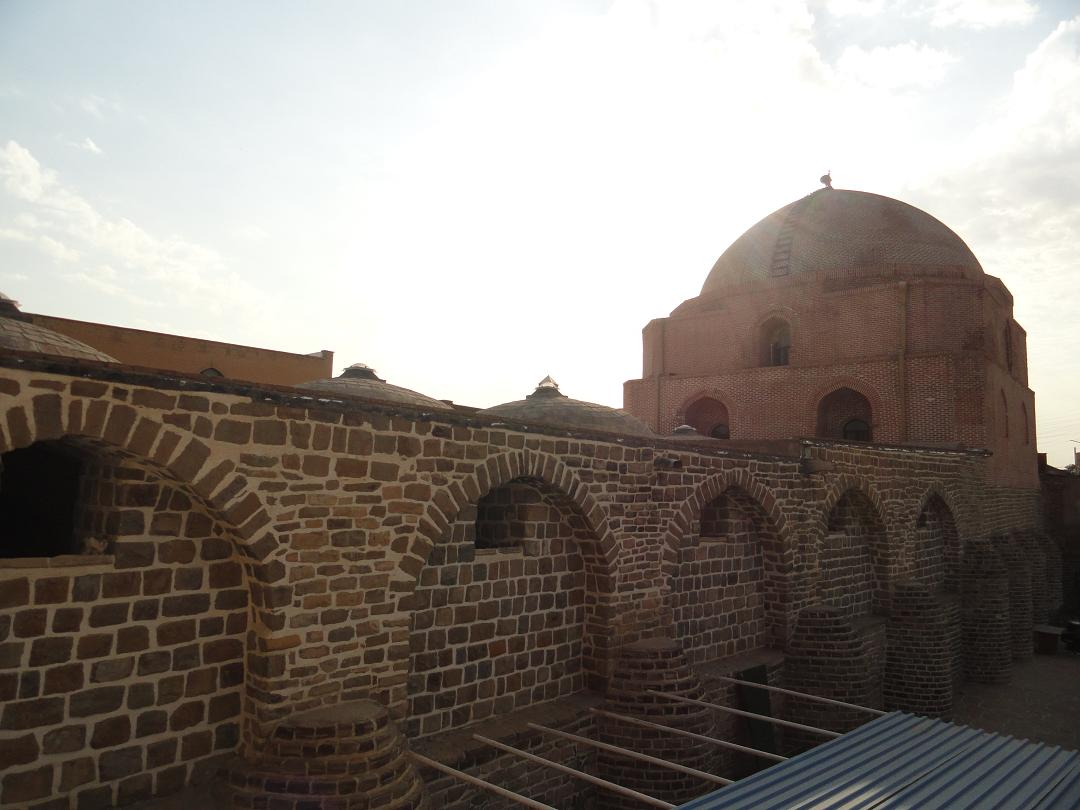
Jameh Mosque of Urmia

Azerbaijanis hold festivals and ceremonies such as Nowruz and Eid al-Adha like other Iranian ethnic groups with small differences. Ashik music is one of the features of the Turkish speaking people of the world. It has different versions in Iran. Meanwhile, as many experts of this art testify the Urmia Ashik, is the most original and oldest version in the world, which has preserved its origin until the present day. Ashik music has its unique styles. As a piece of the culture of Azerbaijan, Urmia Ashik music has been registered in Iran's national heritage.

=== Museums ===
- Natural History Museum – Displays the animals native to the vicinity of Urmia.
- Urmia Museum – Archaeological museum affiliated with the faculty of Shahid Beheshti University.
- Urmia Museum of Crafts and Classical Arts.
- Urmia Museum of َAnthropology.

== Education ==
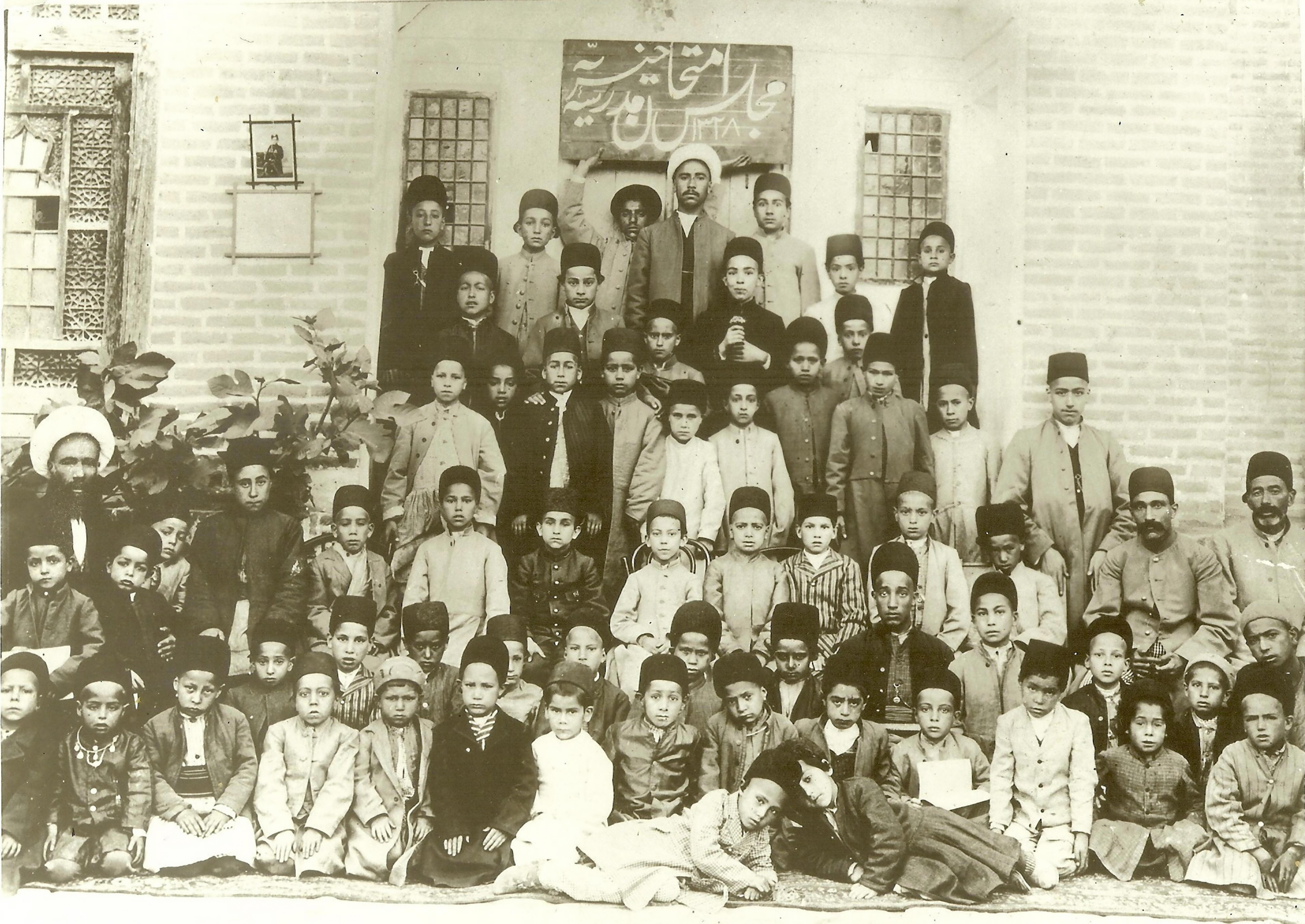
A School in Urmia (1910)

The first modern style school established in Urmia in 1834.

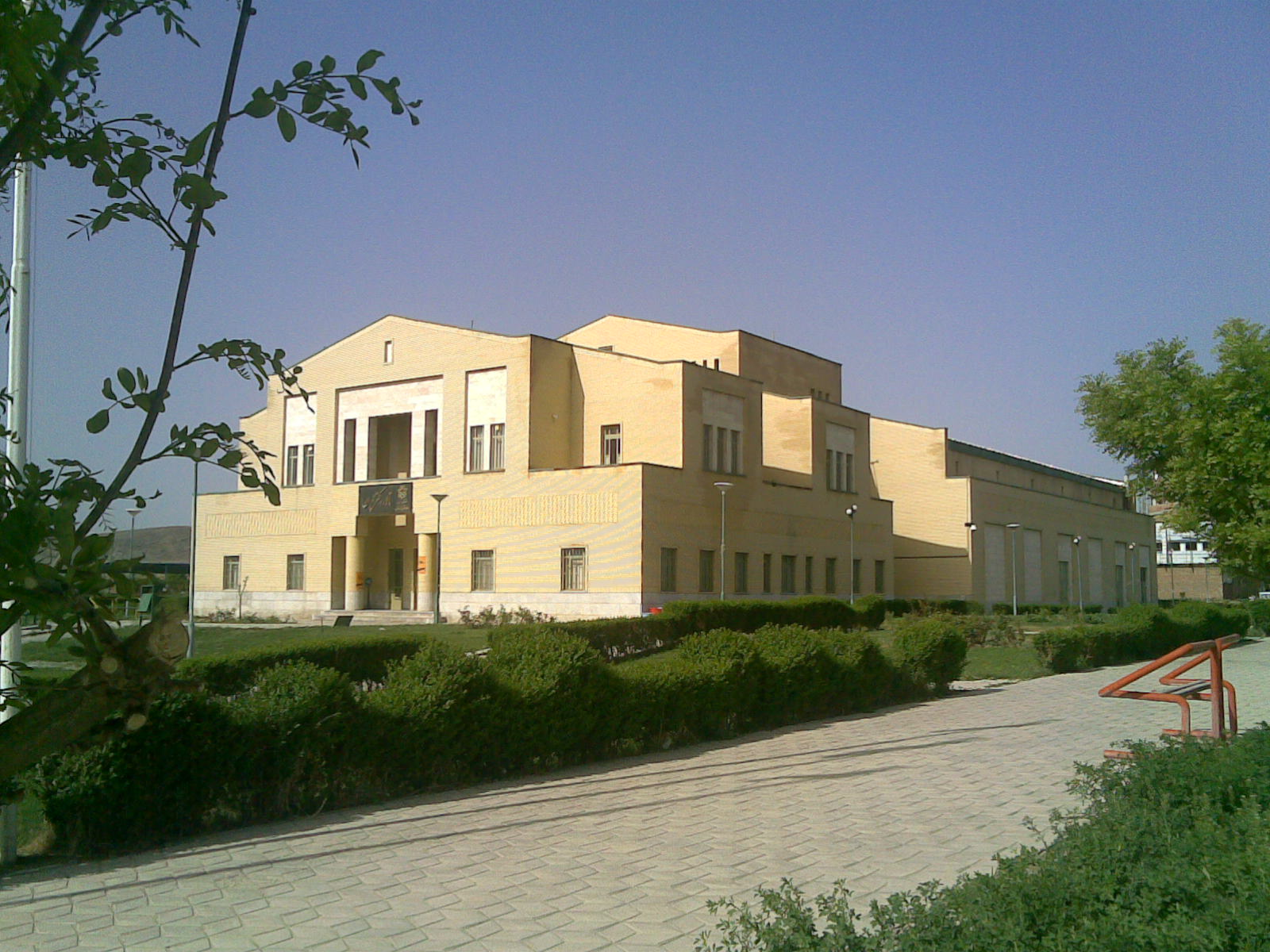
Urmia University's hall

=== Higher education ===
Urmia was an important centre for higher education approximately a century ago; indeed, the medical college of Urmia, which was built by Joseph Cochran and a team of American medical associates in 1878, is the first modern university of Iran. Unfortunately, the college was shut down even before the establishment of the first official University of Iran, University of Tehran. Today, Urmia has become an important centre of education, with several state and private universities and institutes, including those listed below.

Universities in Urmia:

University	Web Site
Urmia University	
Malek Ashtar University of Technology Urmia Branch	
Urmia University of Medical Sciences	
Urmia University of Technology	
Islamic Azad University of Urmia	
Payame Noor University of Urmia	
Elmi Karbordi University of Urmia	
University College of Saba	
University College of Azarabadegan	
University College of Elm O fan	
University College of Kamal	
Shahid Beheshti Technical School	
Ghazi Tabatabaee Technical School	
The Girls Technical School of Urmia	
Najand Institute of Higher Education	
University College Afagh	

=== Libraries ===
- Allame Tabatabayee Library
- Central Library of Urmia
- Library of Ghaem
- Library of I.R. Iran Education Ministry
- Library of Imam Ali
- Library of kanoon parvaresh fekri
- Library of Khane-ye-Javan
- Library of Shahid Motahhari
- Library of Shahid Bahonar
- Library of Urmia Cultural and Artistical Center

== Media ==
=== Television ===
Urmia has one state-owned television channel, Urmia TV, which broadcasts in both Azerbaijani, and Persian, and internationally through satellite Intelsat 902.

=== Radio ===
Urmia has one radio channel broadcasting in Kurdish, Azerbaijani and Persian. The name of the local radio is Chichest.

=== Press ===
Among others, the city's print media include:

- Orumiye
- Barish news
- Sedaye Urmia
- Amanat
- Koosha
- Araz

== Infrastructure ==
=== Transportation ===
Most of Urmia's residents travel by car through the system of roads and highways. Urmia is also served by taxis and public buses. There are also some private groups that provide services called "Phone-taxi." Two Tram-lines for Urmia are Planned.

Urmia is linked to Europe through Turkey's roads and Sero border crossing. Urmia Airport, which opened in 1964, was the first international airport in West Azerbaijan county, Iran. As of April 2015 it only has regularly scheduled domestic flights to Tehran's Mehrabad International Airport, although there are plans to establish a direct flight between Urmia and Erbil, due to the large number of passengers travelling between the two cities. The city is recently connected to Iran National Railways (IRIR, رجا).

=== Health systems ===
The Iranian government operates public hospitals in the Urmia metropolitan region. There are also a number of private hospitals and medical centers in the city. Hospitals include: Hospitals:

- 523 Artesh(Army) Hospital
- Arefian Hospital
- Azerbaijan Hospital
- Gholipour Children's Hospital
- Imam Khomeini Hospital
- Imam Reza Hospital
- Milad international medical center
- Motahari Hospital
- Omid Hospital
- Razi Psychiatry Hospital
- Taleghani Hospital
- Seyedoshohada Heart Hospital
- Shafa Hospital
- Shams Hospital
- Solati Hospital

Clinics:

- Fatimiye Pro-Medical Clinic
- Kosar Women's Pro-Medical Clinic

=== Consulates ===
The Turkish government has a consulate on Beheshti Avenue.

== People ==
During its history Urmia was the origin for many Iranian illumination and modernization movements. The city was the hometown of numerous figures including politicians, revolutionaries, artists, and military leaders. Following is a partial list of some of the people who was born or lived in Urmia.

For a complete list see: Category:People from Urmia

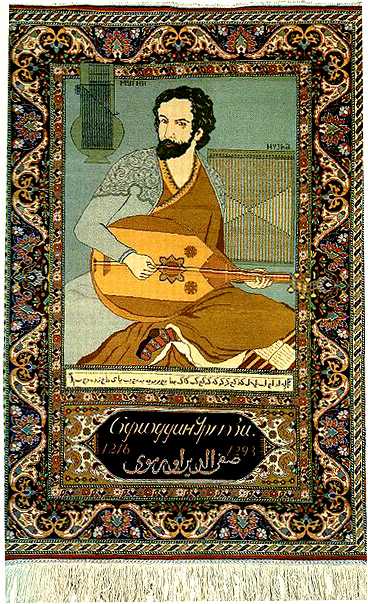
Safi al-Din al-Urmawi, was a renowned musician and writer on the theory of music.

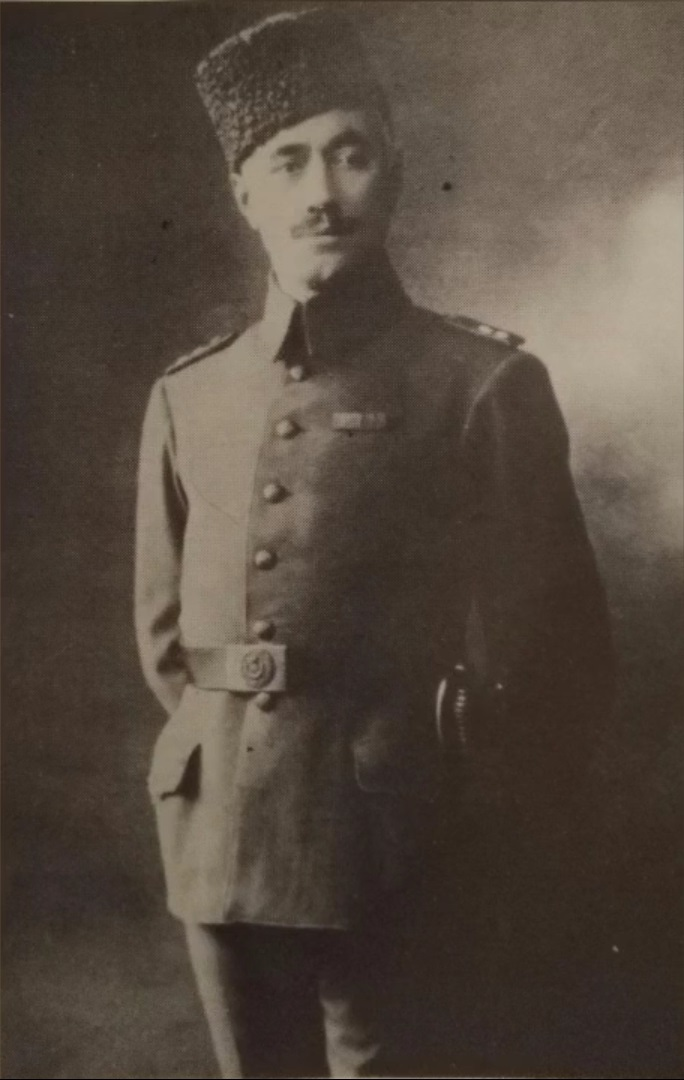
Haydar Khan e Amo-oghli, was a leftist revolutionary during the Iranian Constitutional Revolution and among the founders of the Communist Party of Iran.

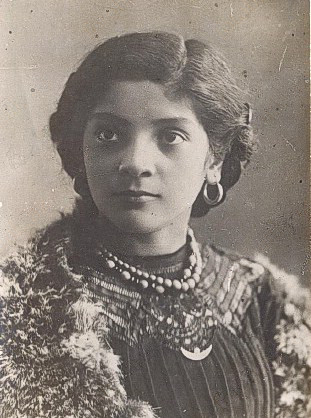
Fatma Mukhtarova, was a Soviet opera singer.

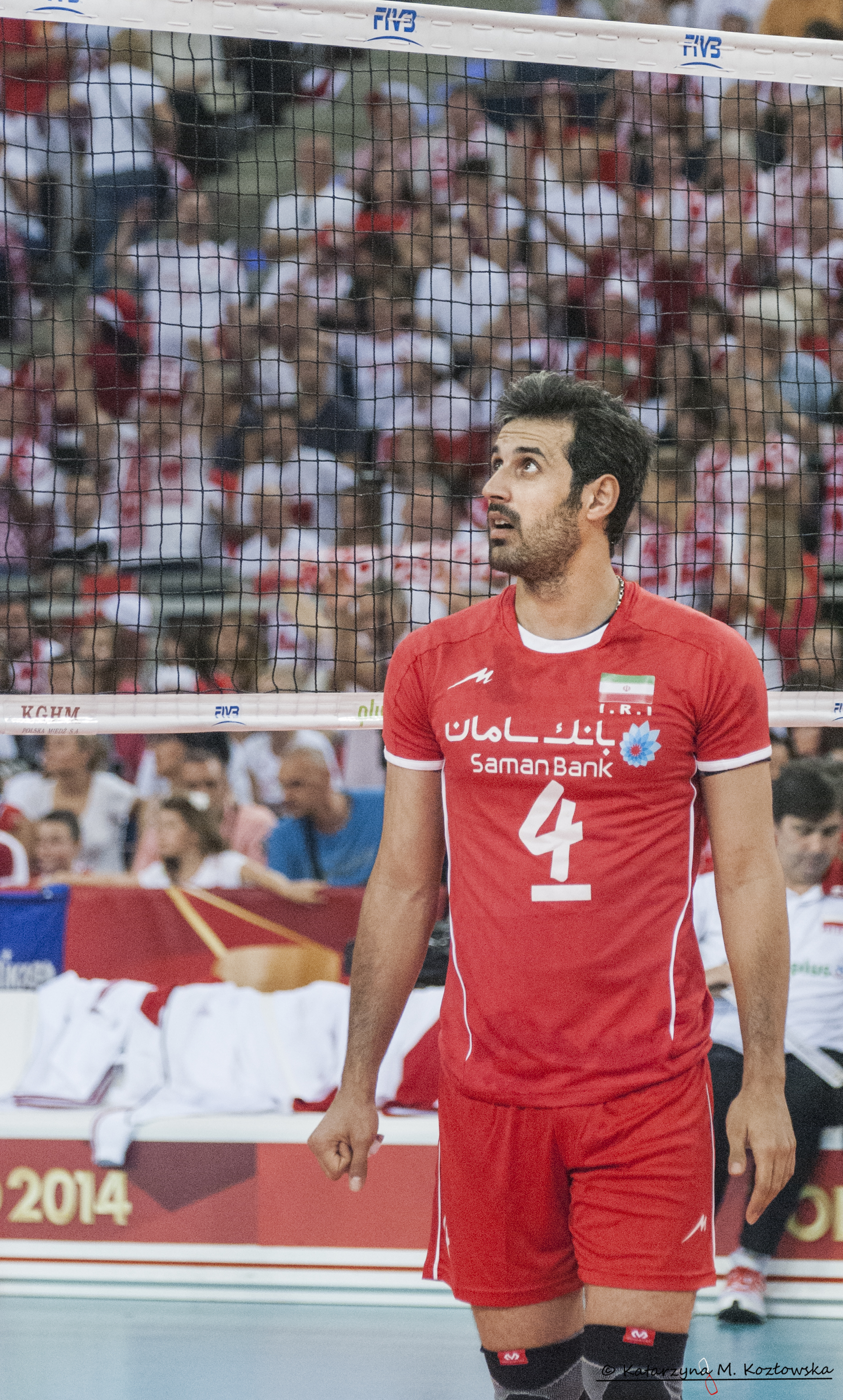
Saeid Marouf, is an Iranian volleyball player who plays as a setter for the Iranian national team which he captains.

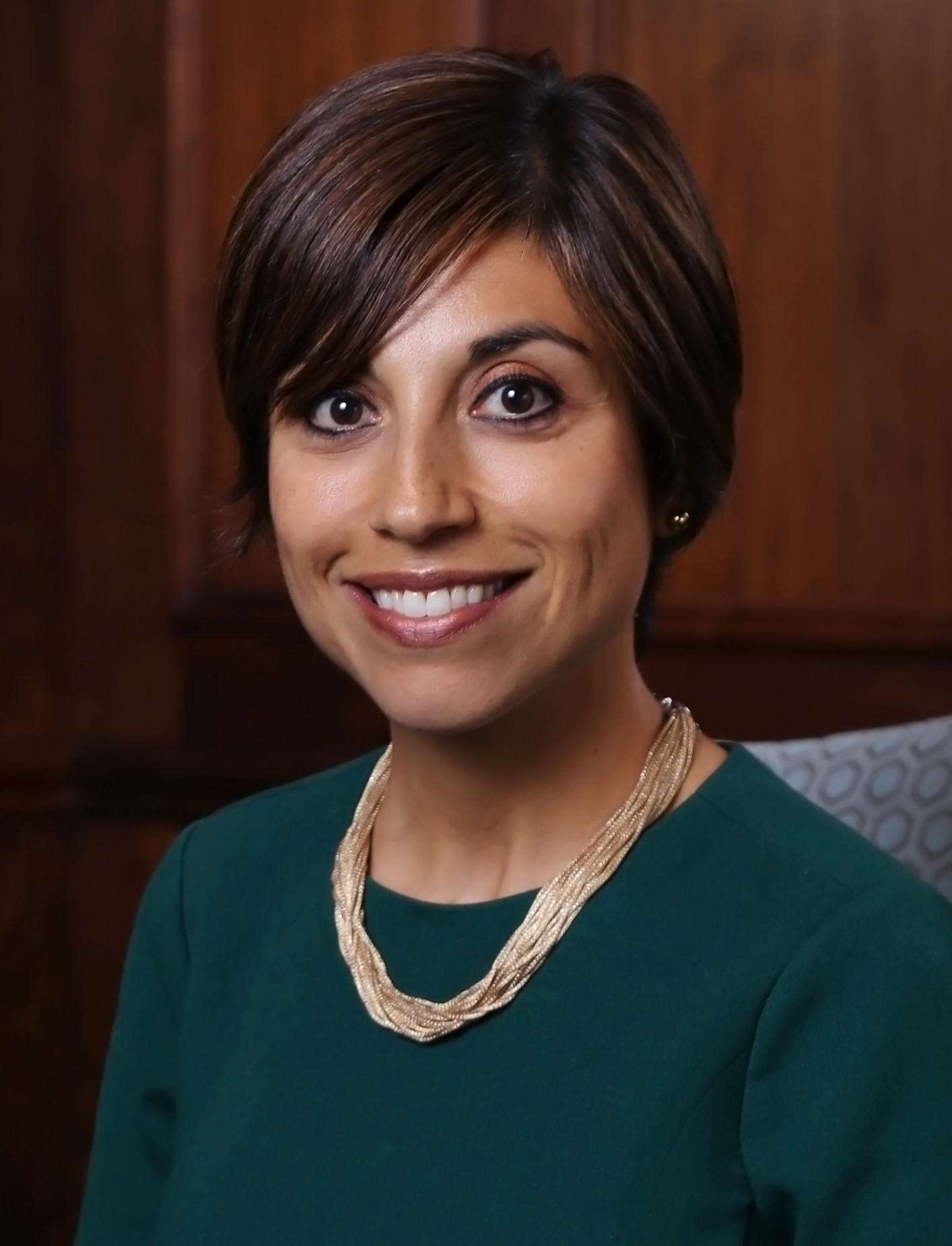
Mehrsa Baradaran, an American law professor at the University of California, Irvine, was born in Urmia

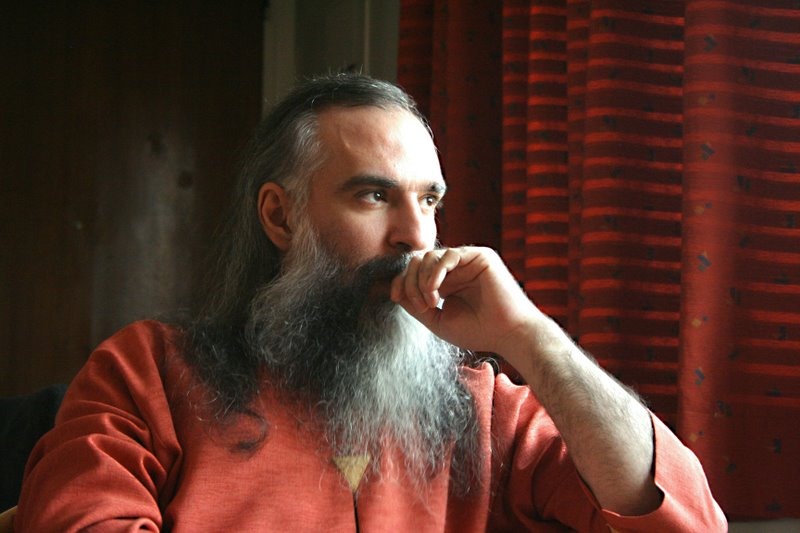
Davood Azad, is an Iranian classical and folk music singer.

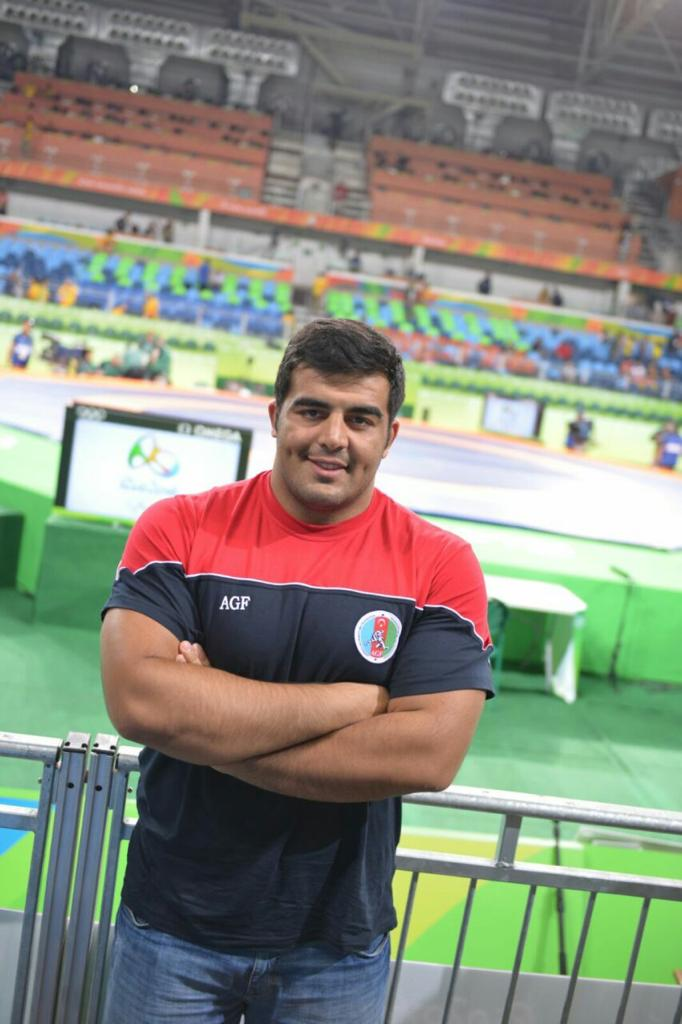
Oyan Nazariani, is an Azerbaijani Beach wrestling and Greco-Roman wrestler born in Urmia. He is the head coach of the Azerbaijani beach wrestling team.

== Twin towns and sister cities ==
- Erzurum, Turkey (since 2015)
- Trabzon, Turkey
- Varna, Bulgaria

== See also ==
- 64th Infantry Division of Urmia
- Ark of Nuh or Noah
- Assyrian homeland
- Christian Neo-Aramaic dialect of Urmia
- Emirate of Bradost
- Russian Ecclesiastical Mission in Urmia
- Teppe Hasanlu
- Urmia Orthodokseta
