= Jameh Mosque of Urmia =

Mosque in Urmia, West Azerbaijan, Iran

Jāmeh Mosque of Urmia
- مسجد جامع ارومیه
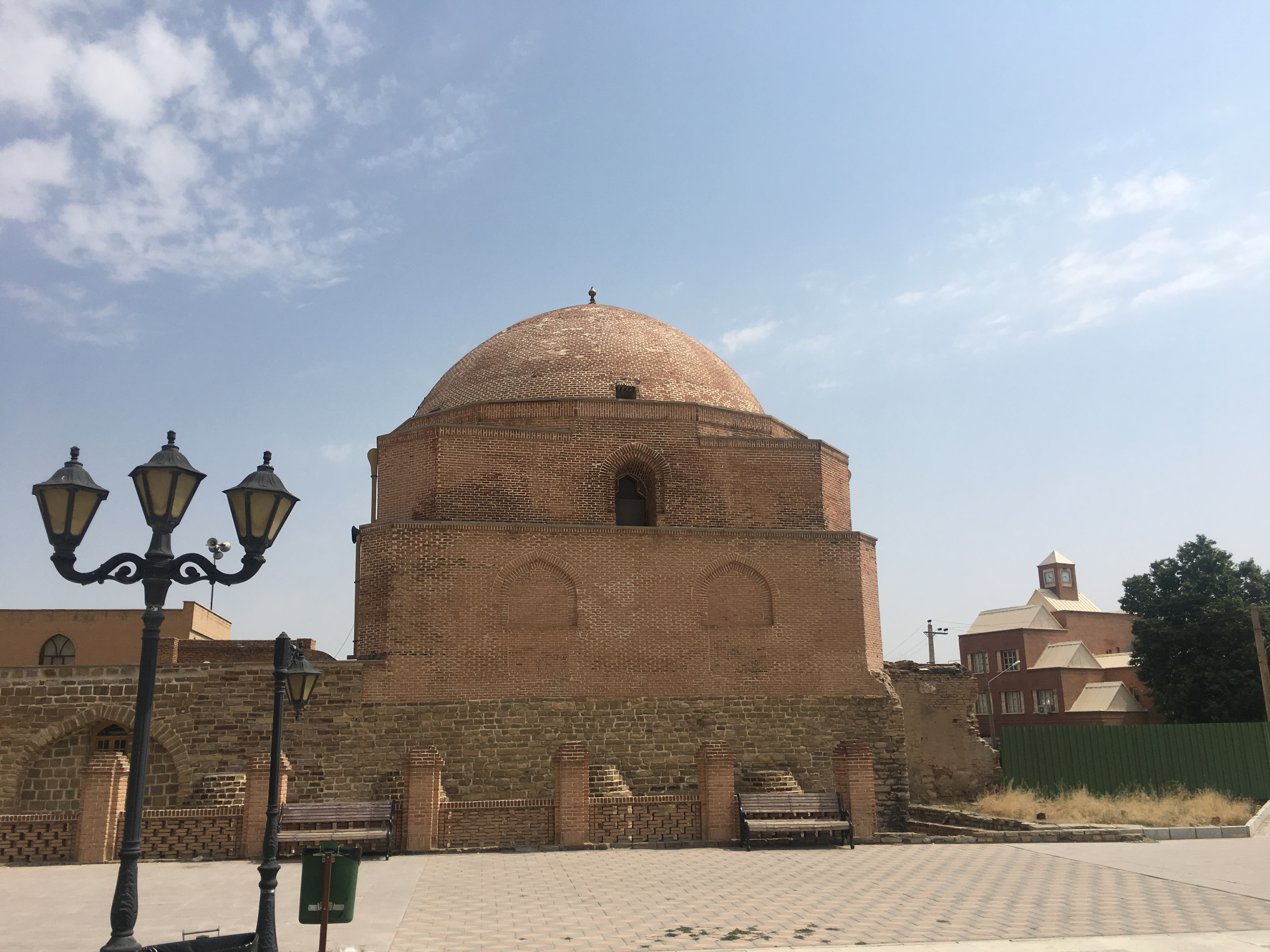

- Location of the mosque in Iran

Religion
- Affiliation: Islam
- Ecclesiastical or organisational status: Friday mosque
- Status: Active

Location
- Location: Urmia, West Azerbaijan province
- Country: Iran
- Interactive map of Jāmeh Mosque of Urmia
- Coordinates: 37°33′03″N 45°04′33″E

Architecture
- Type: Mosque architecture
- Style: Iranian; Ilkhanid; Zand; Qajar
- Completed: 1278 CE

Specifications
- Dome: One
- Materials: Stone; bricks; plaster; tiles

Iran National Heritage List
- Official name: Friday Mosque of Urmia
- Type: Friday Mosque
- Designated: 1935
- Reference no.: 243
- Conservation organization: Cultural Heritage, Handicrafts and Tourism Organization of Iran

The Jāmeh Mosque of Urmia (Persian: مسجد جامع ارومیه, romanized: Masjid-e-Jāmeh Orumieh), also known as the Rezayieh Mosque (Persian: مسجد رضائیه, romanized: Masjid-e-Rezayieh), is a Friday mosque (jāmeh), located in Urmia, in the province of West Azerbaijan, Iran. The mosque is situated in the older part of the city and was completed in 1278 CE, during the Ilkhanate era.

The mosque was added to the Iran National Heritage List on 7 December 1935, administered by the Cultural Heritage, Handicrafts and Tourism Organization of Iran.

== Gallery ==
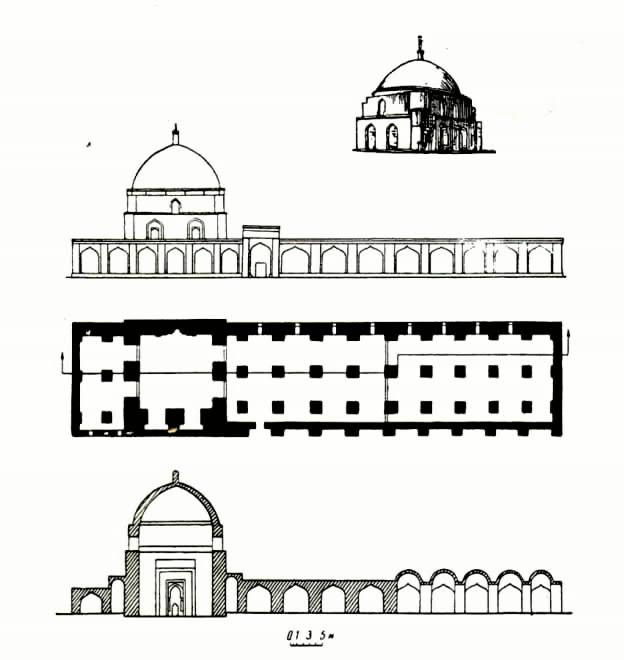
Plan of the building

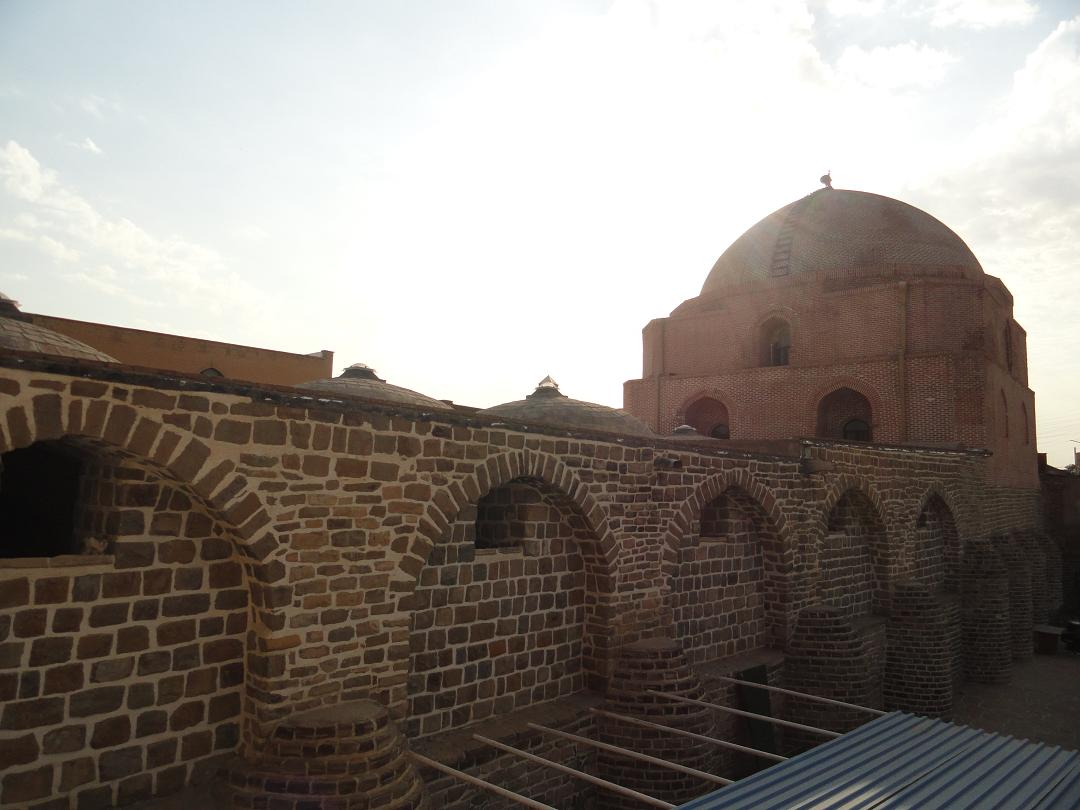

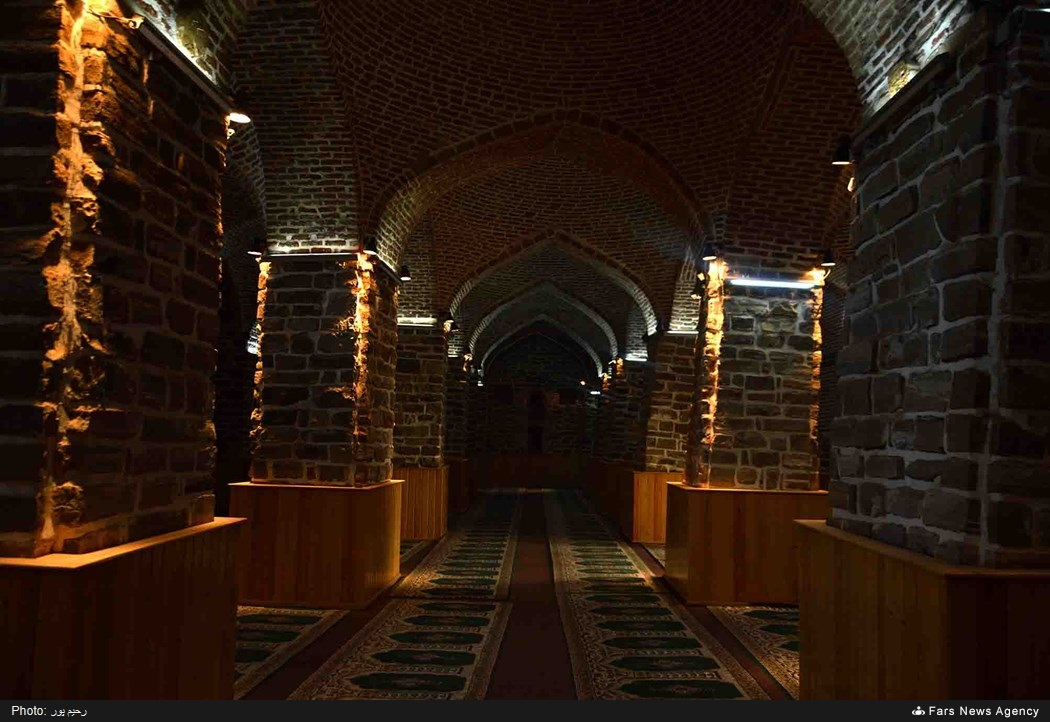

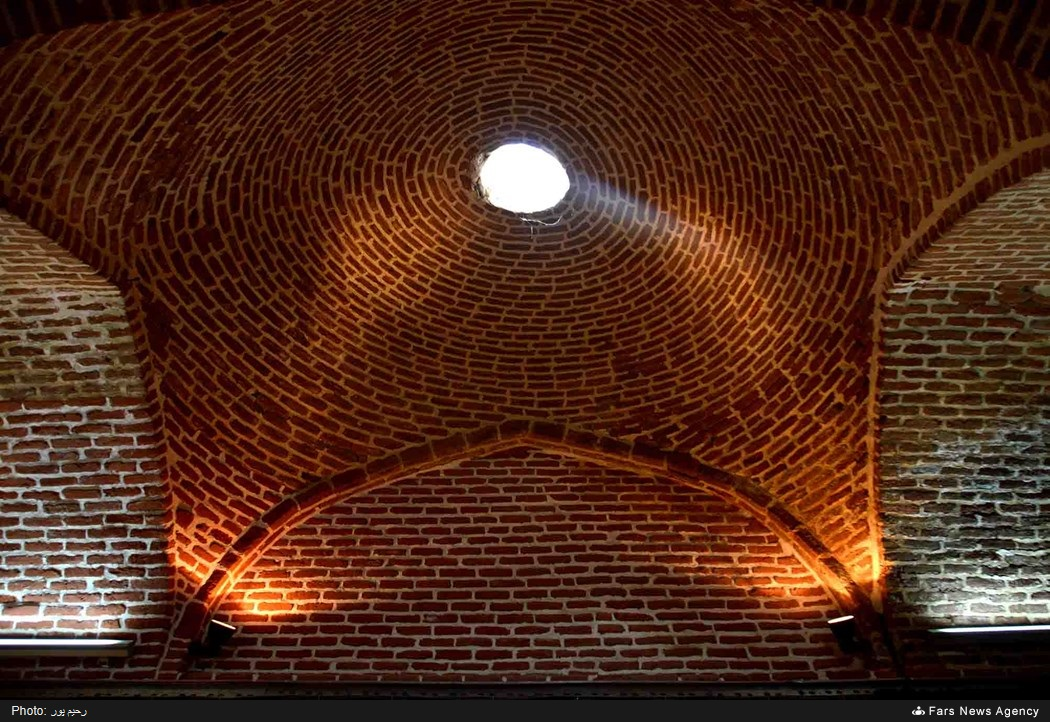

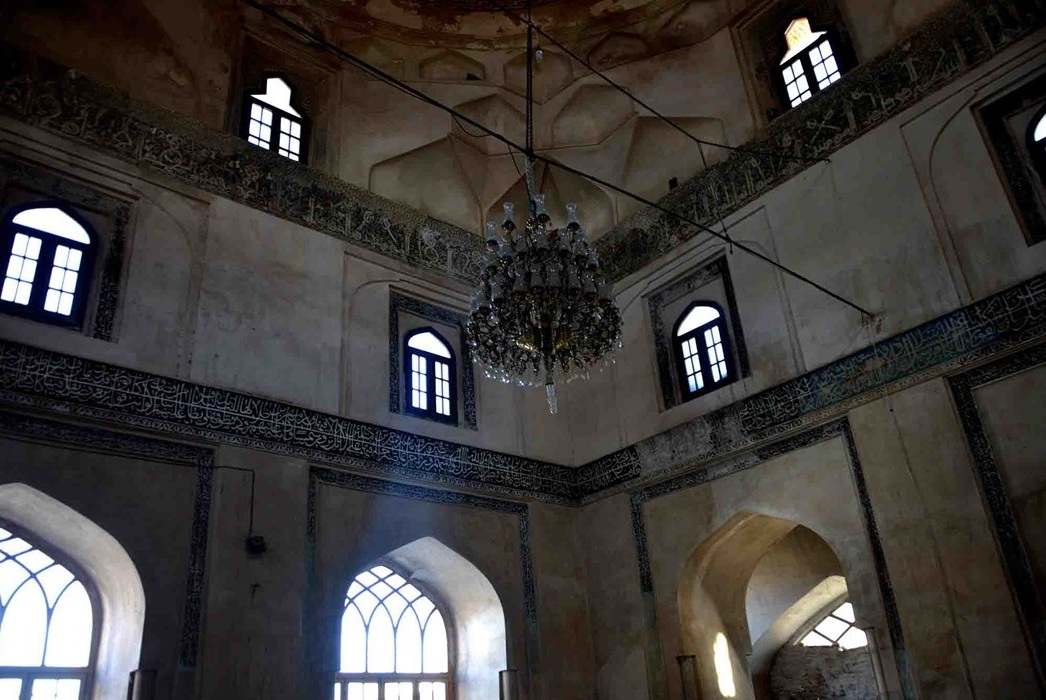

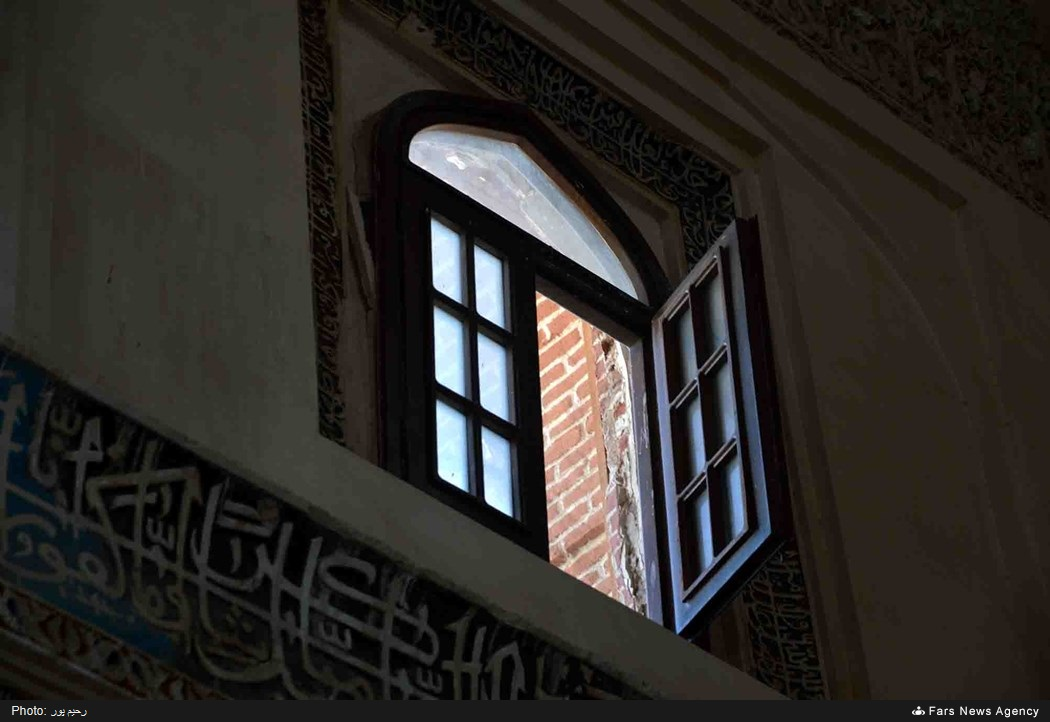

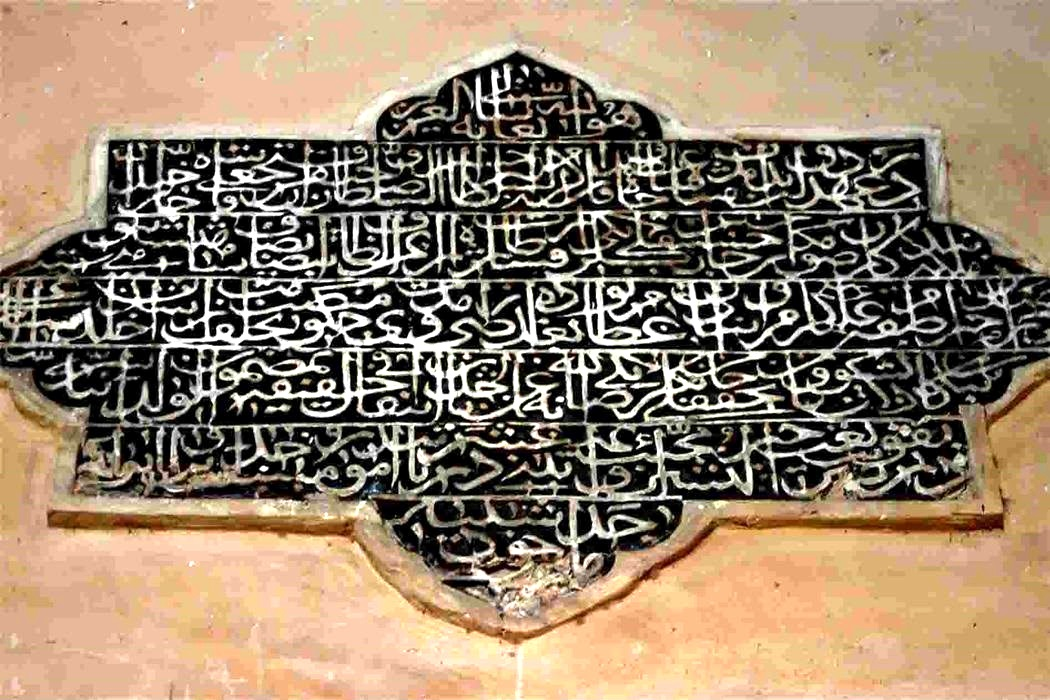

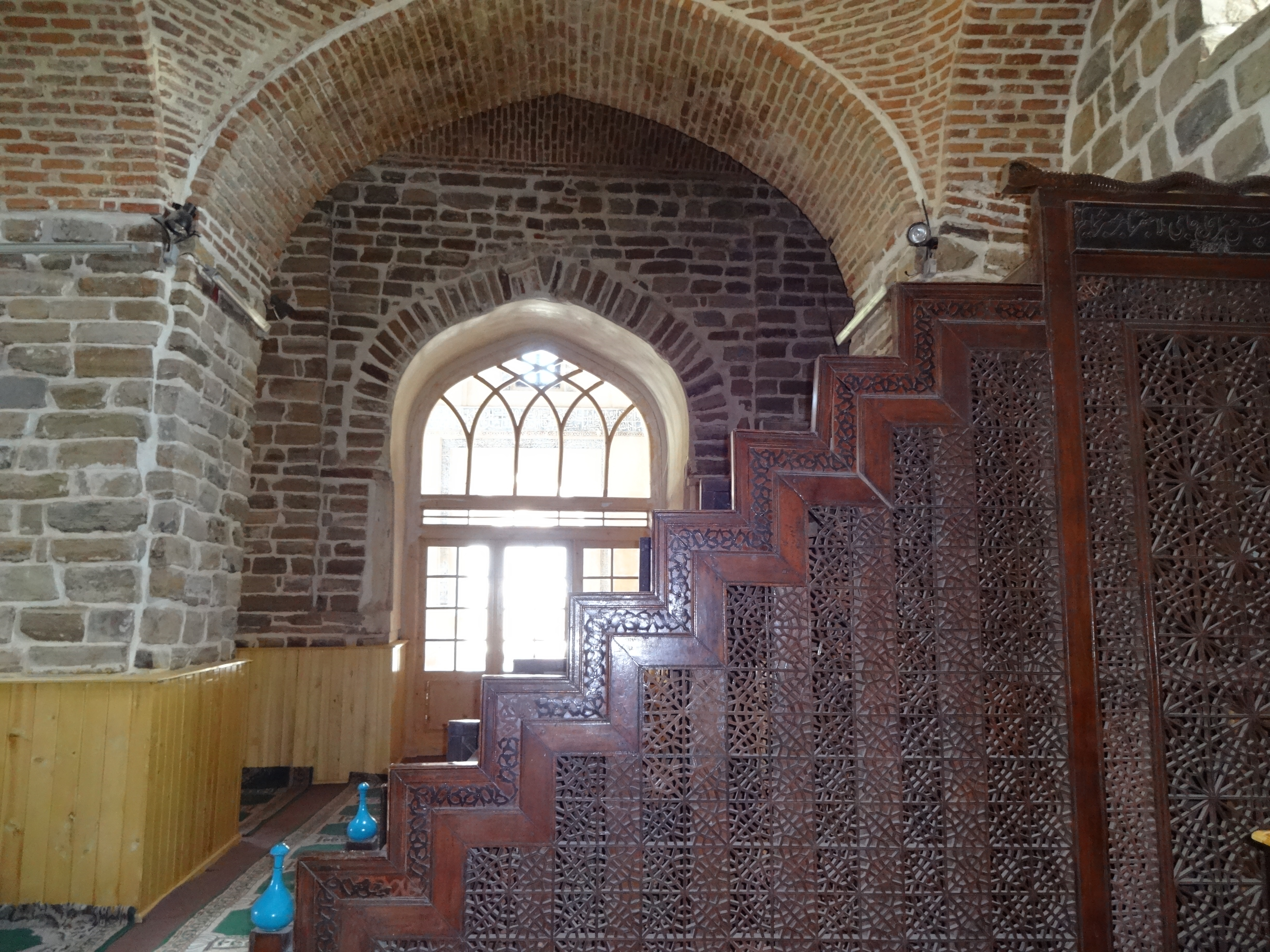

== See also ==
- Islam in Iran
- List of mosques in Iran
- Holiest sites in Islam
