= St. Mary Church, Urmia =

Ancient Assyrian church in Urmia, Northern Iran, Iran

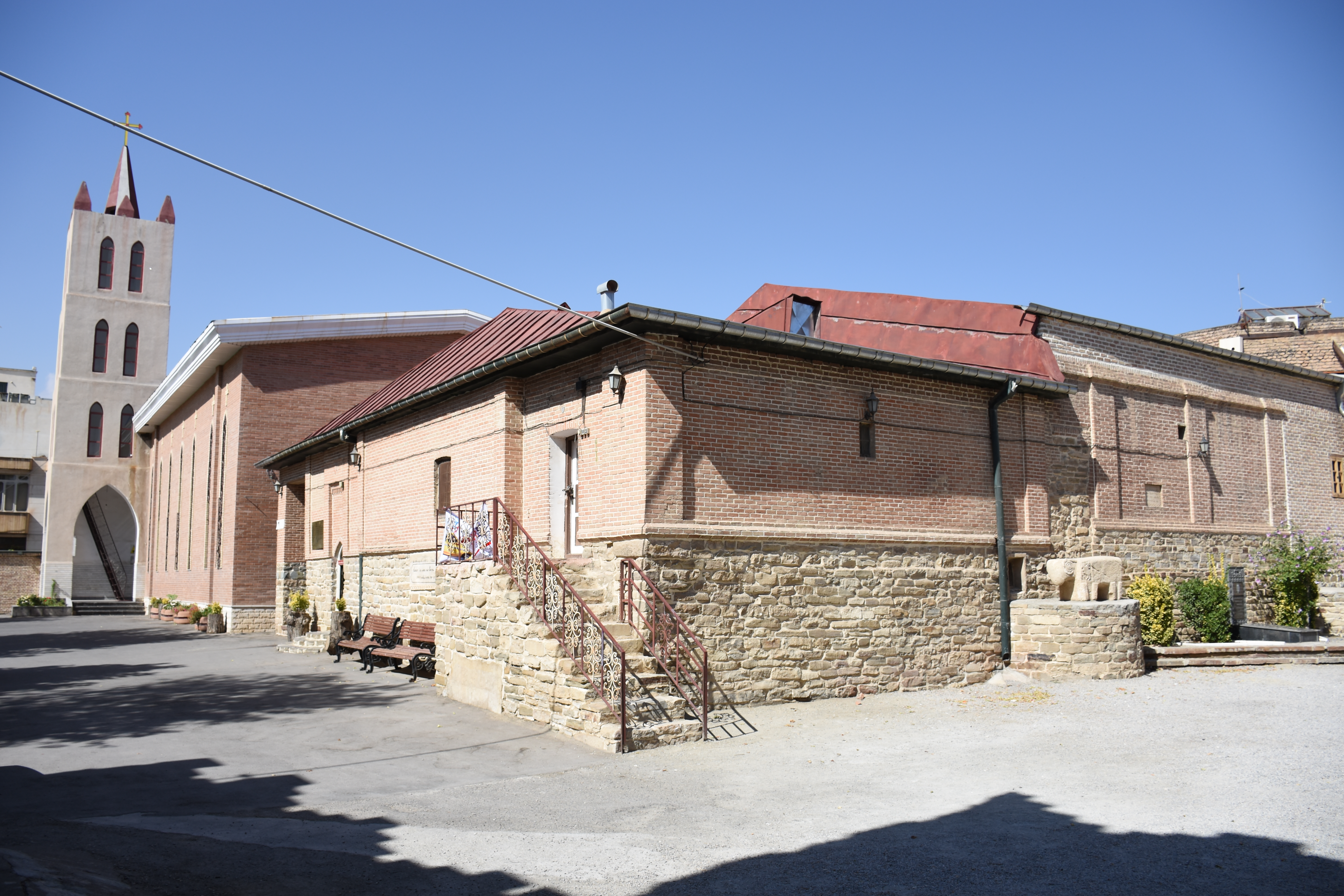
- St. Mary Church in Urmia

- Location within Iran

Religion
- Affiliation: Assyrian Church of the East

Location
- Location: Urmia, West Azarbaijan Province, Iran
- Interactive map of St. Mary Church, Urmia
- Coordinates: 37°32′39.4″N 45°04′04.0″E

Architecture
- Type: Church
- Groundbreaking: 1st/7th century

St. Mary Church (Classical Syriac: ܥܕܬܐ ܕܩܕܝܫܬܐ ܡܪܝܡ ܥܕܬܐ, Persian: کلیسای ننه مریم) is an ancient Assyrian church located in the city of Urmia, West Azerbaijan province, Iran.

The current old building of the church belongs to the Sasanian era and its interior design is a combination of Sasanian and Arsacid architecture.

A Chinese princess, who contributed to its reconstruction in 642 AD, had her name "Bafri" engraved on a stone on the church wall. The inscription was lost after the First World War. The famous Italian traveller Marco Polo is said to have visited the church.

Briefly prior to the World War I, it was converted by Russians to a Russian Orthodox church.

In the early 1960s, the old church was restored and a modern church with a spire was built adjacent to the ancient church.

== Gallery ==
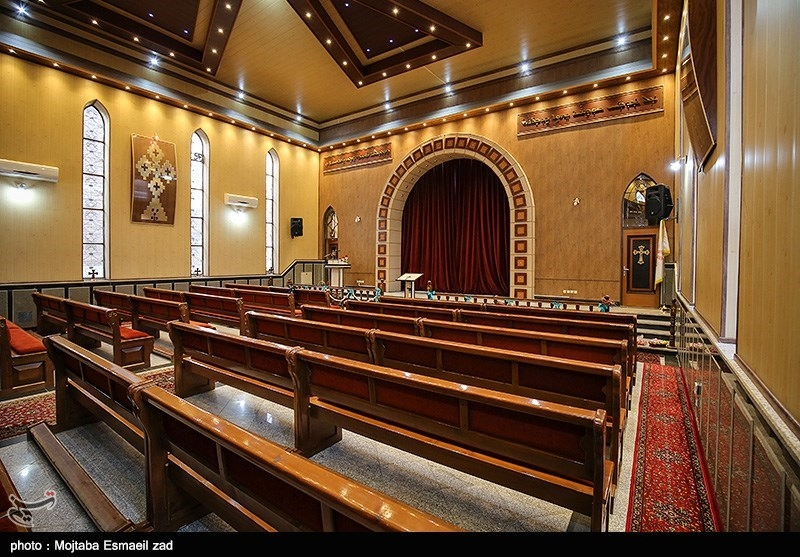

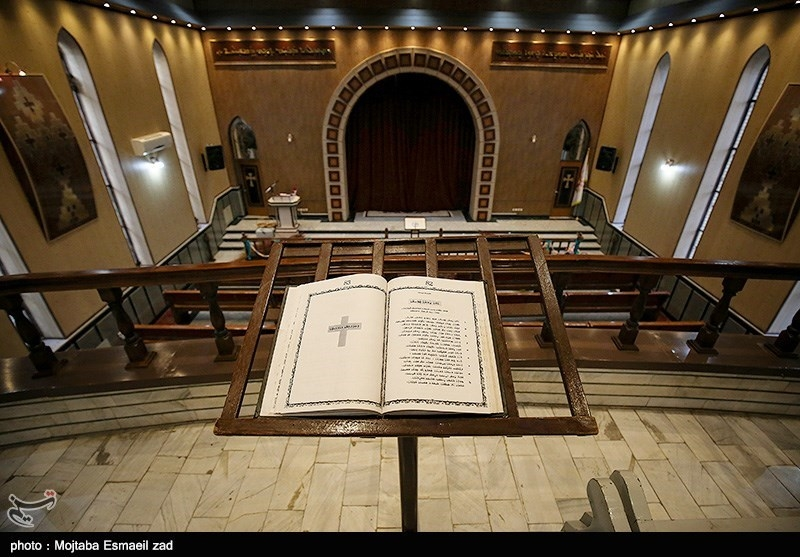

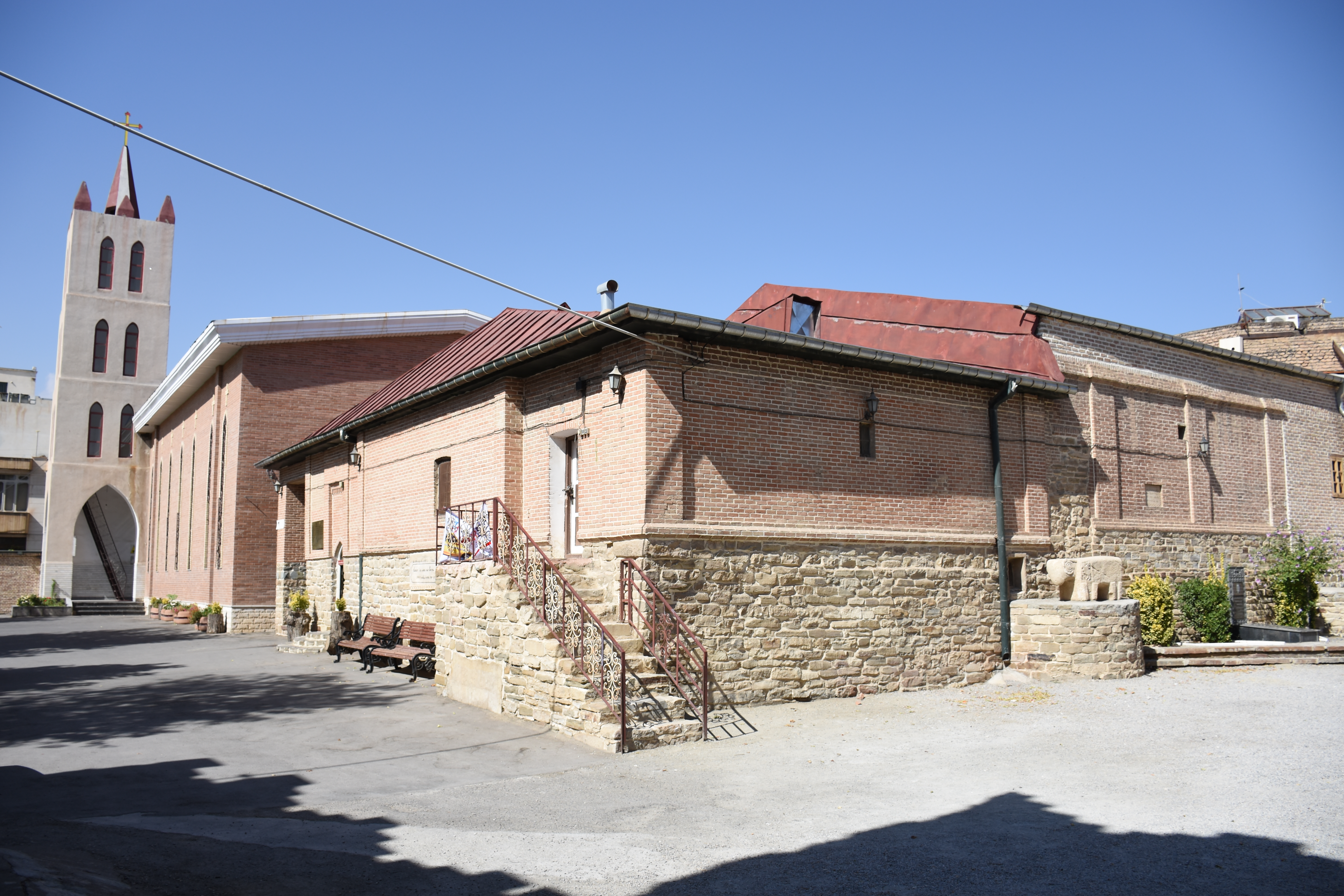

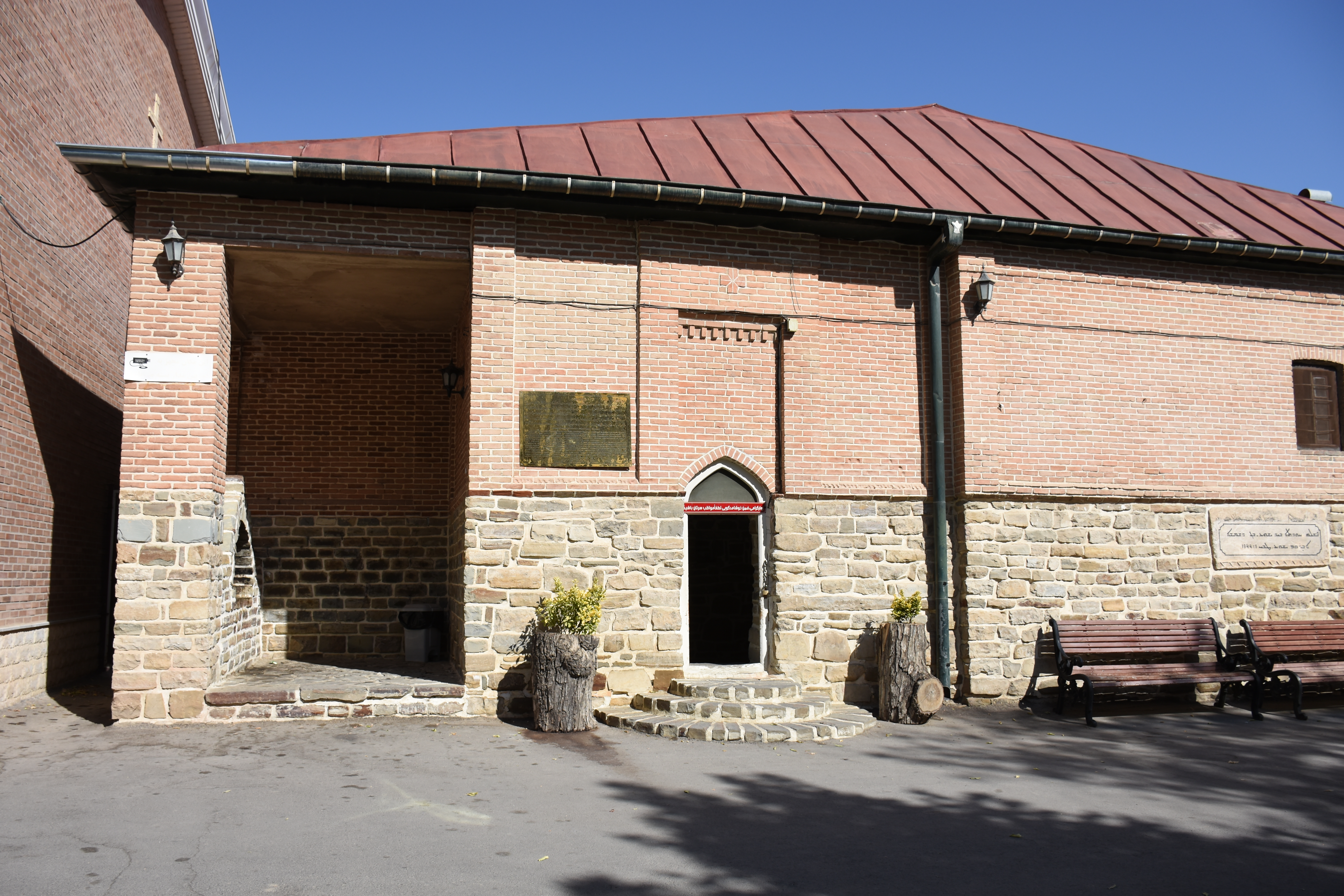

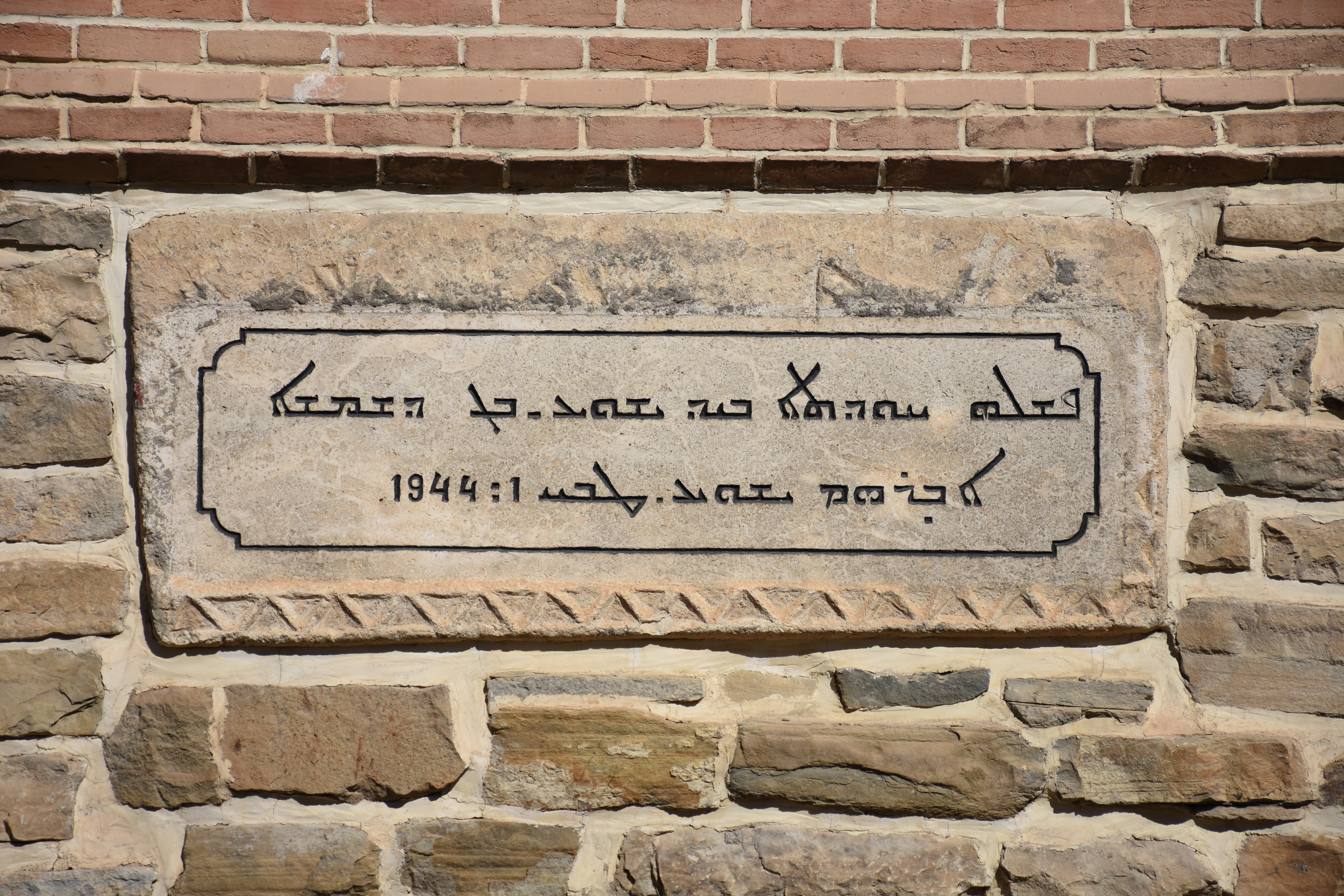

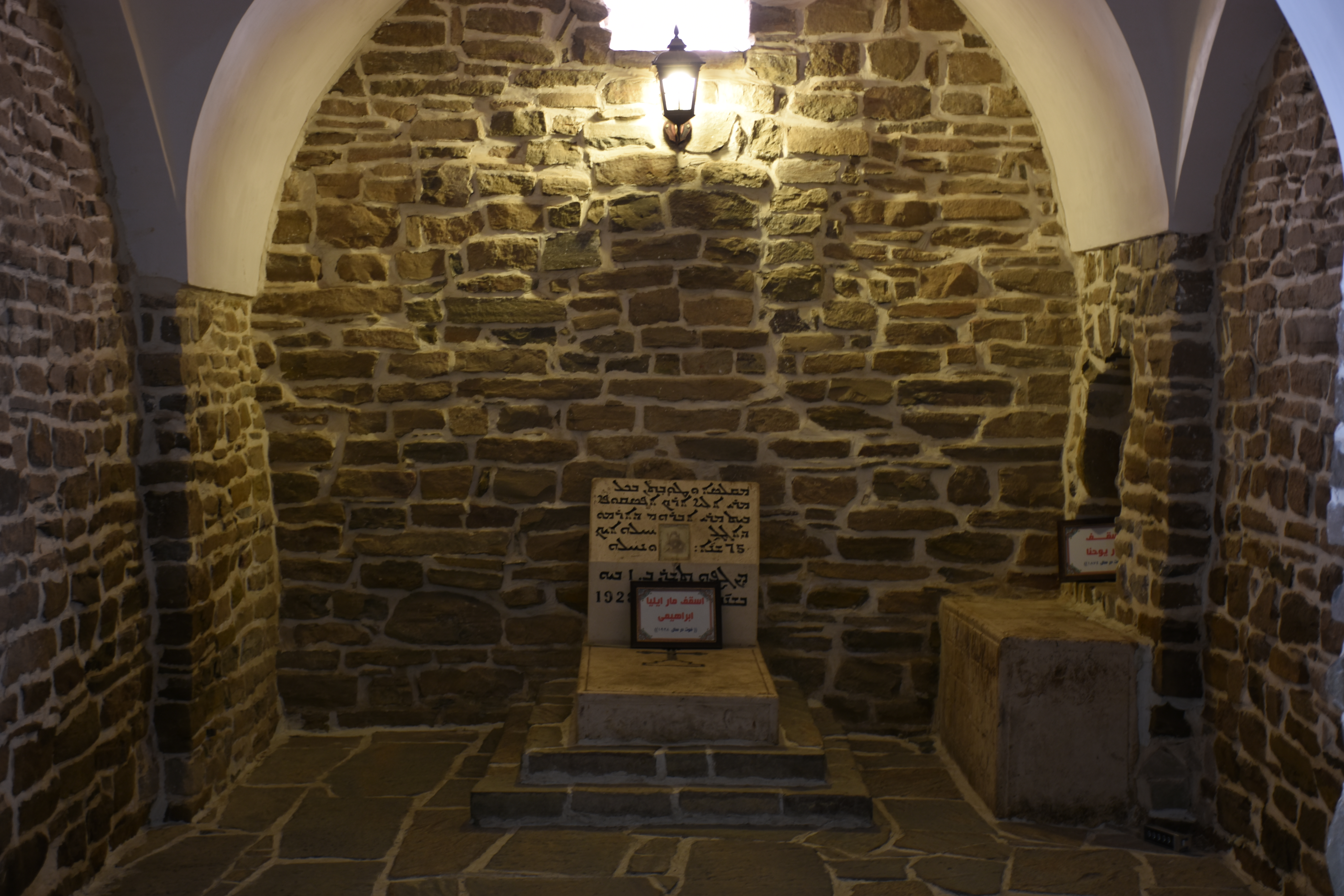

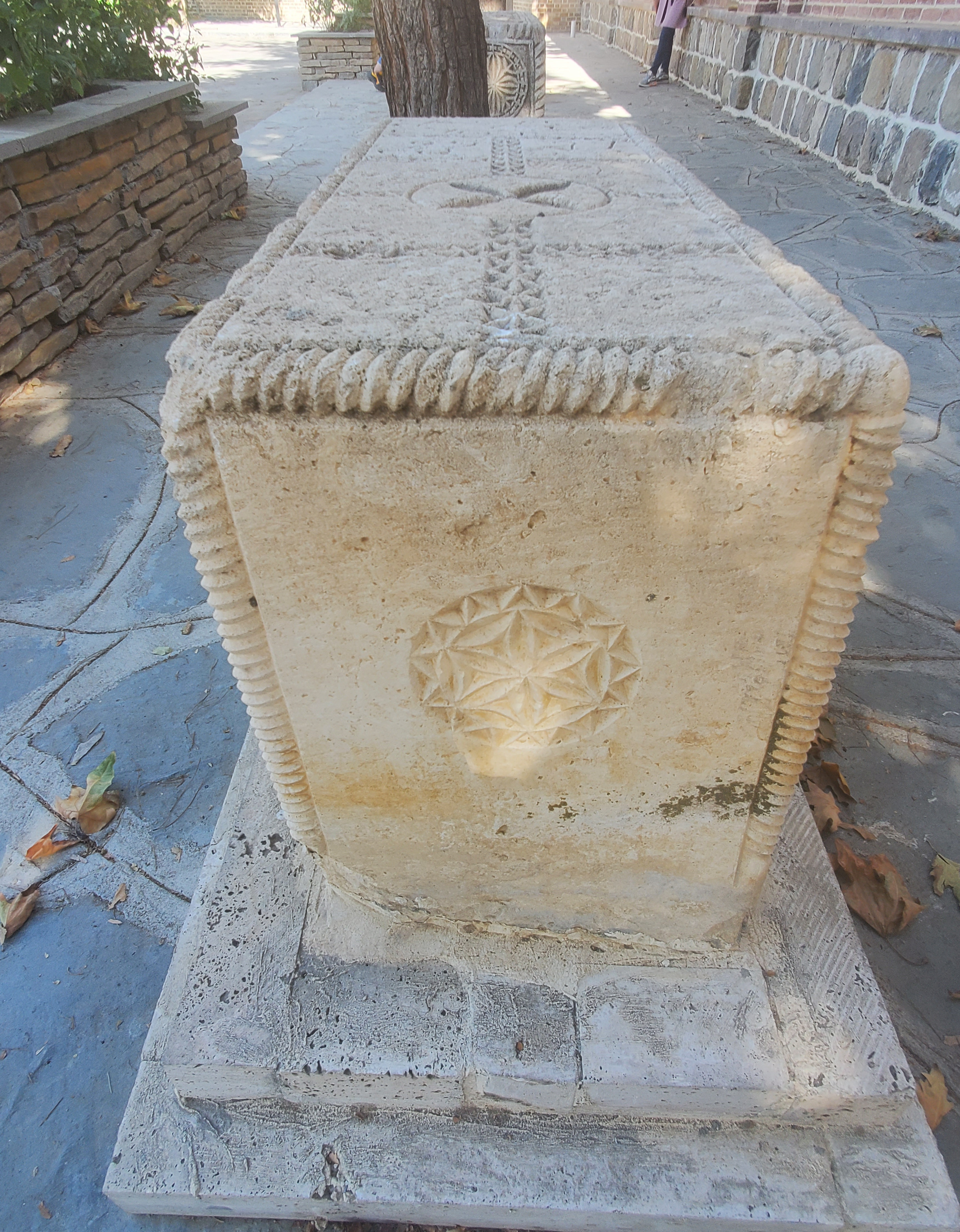

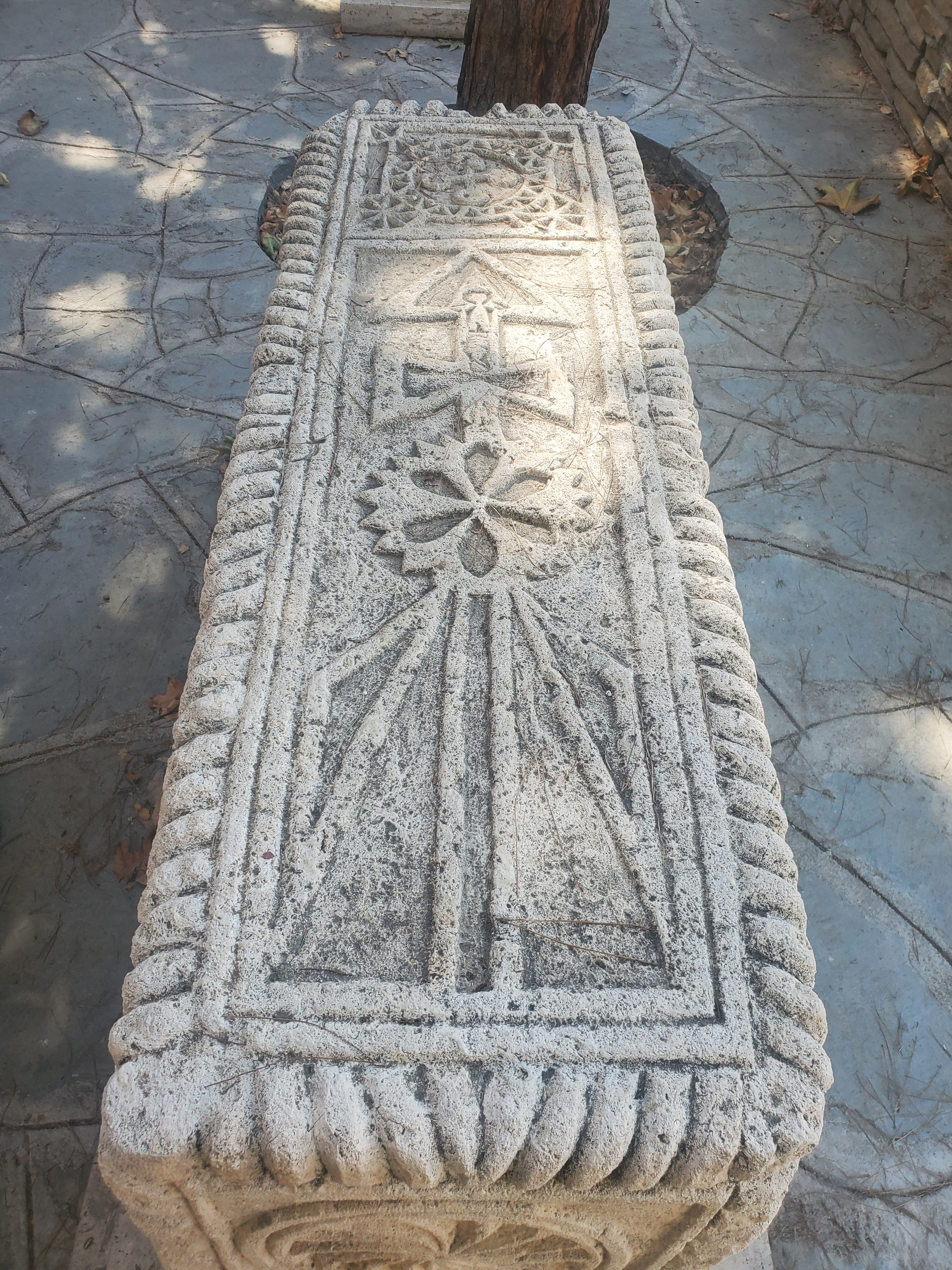

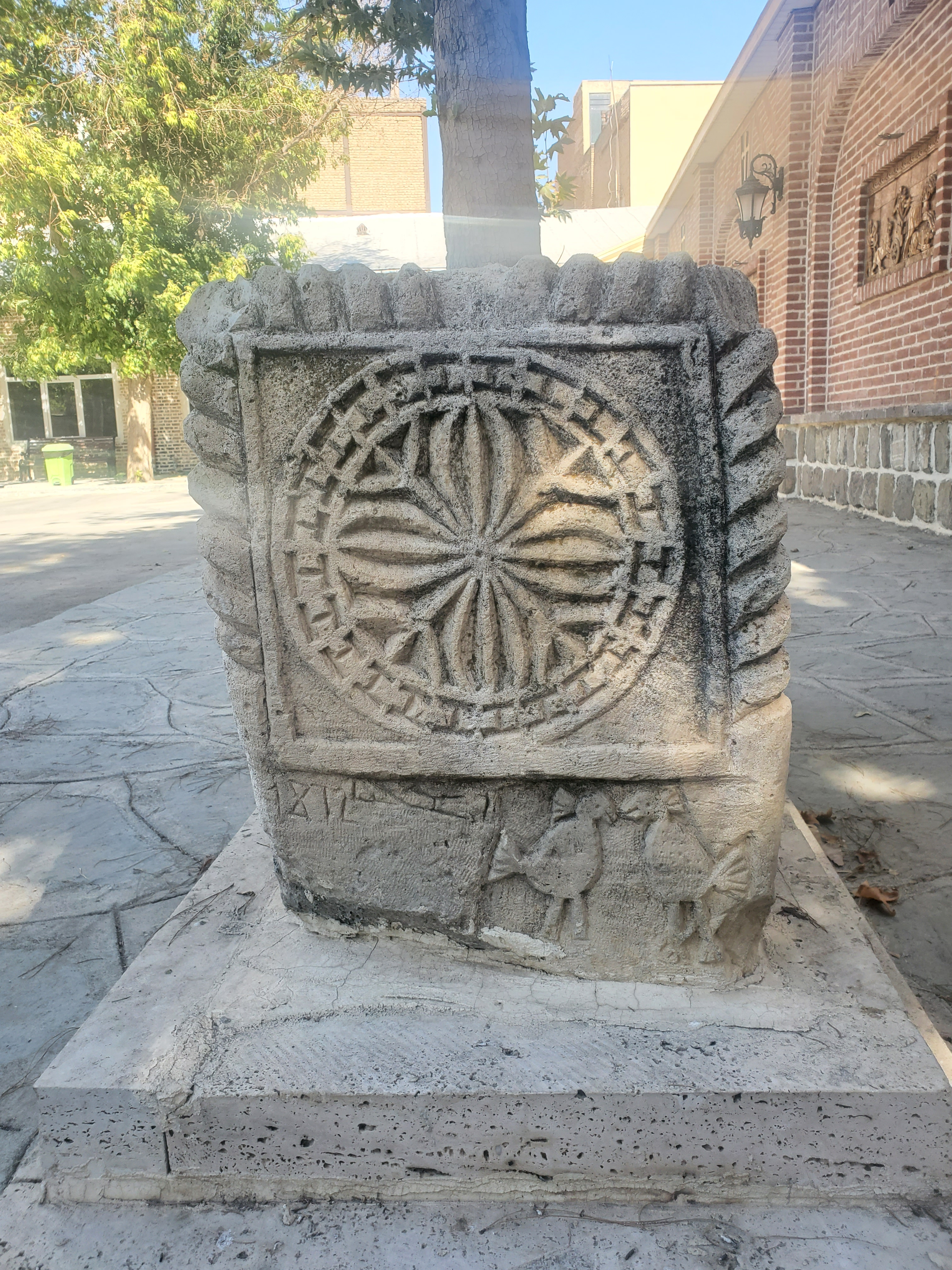

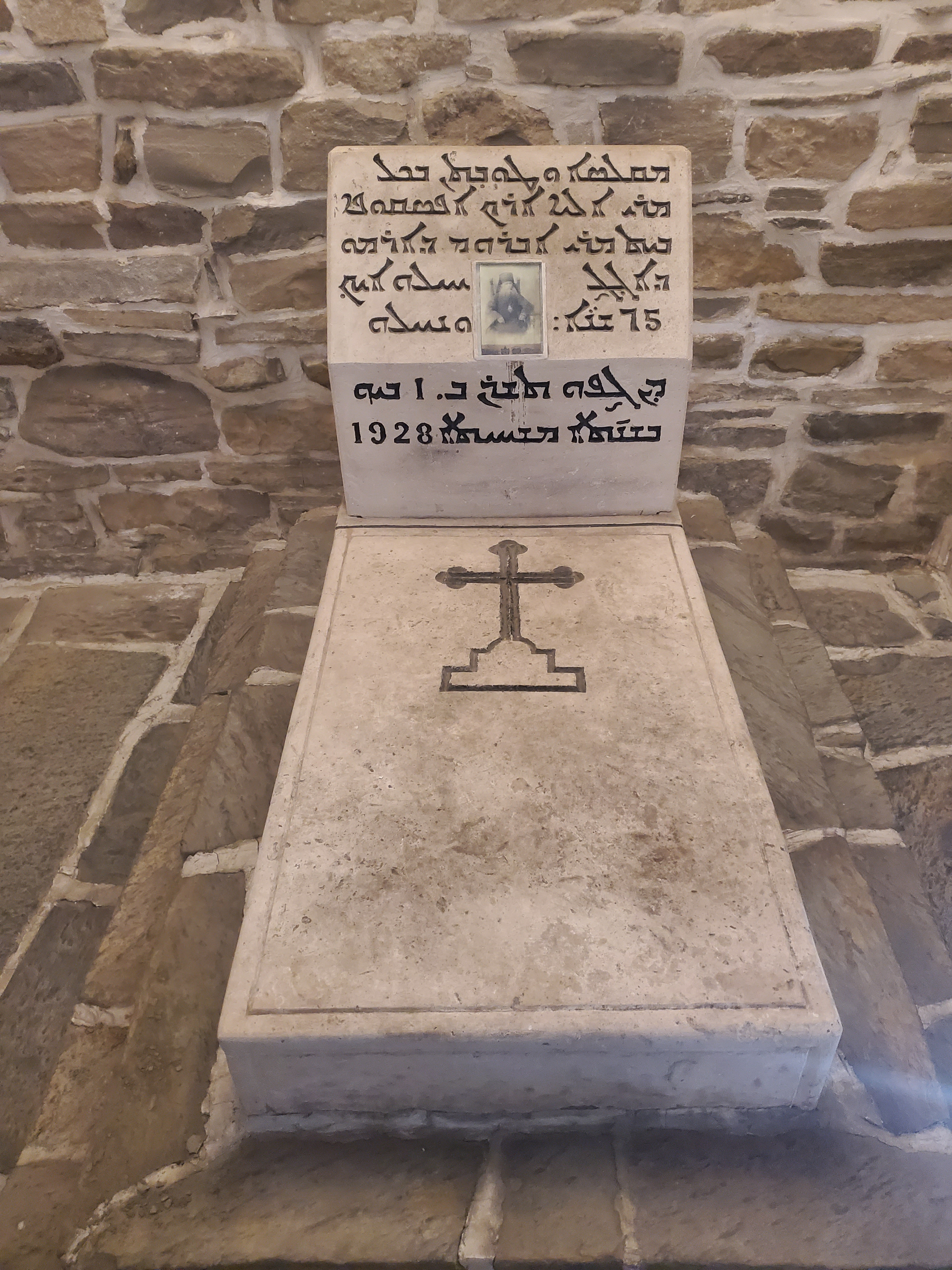

== See also ==
- Iranian Assyrians
