= Mafaran =

Mafaran مافران
- Village
- Location within Iran
- Coordinates: 37°43′50″N 44°40′51″E
- Country: Iran
- Province: West Azerbaijan
- County: Urmia
- Bakhsh: Sumay-ye Beradust
- Rural District: Beradust

Population (2006)
  - Total: 324
- Time zone: UTC+3:30 (IRST)
  - Summer (DST): UTC+4:30 (IRDT)

Mafaran (Persian: مافران, also Romanized as Māfarān) is a village in Beradust Rural District, Sumay-ye Beradust District, Urmia County, West Azerbaijan Province, Iran. At the 2006 census, its population was 324, in 57 families.
