= Dioceses of the Church of the East after 1552 =

Traditional territories of the Church of the East, and its branches, at the beginning of the 20th century

Dioceses of the Church of the East after 1552 were dioceses of the Church of the East and its subsequent branches, both traditionalist (that were eventually consolidated as the Assyrian Church of the East) and pro-Catholic (that were eventually consolidated as the Chaldean Catholic Church).

== Dioceses of the Eliya line, up to 1700 ==
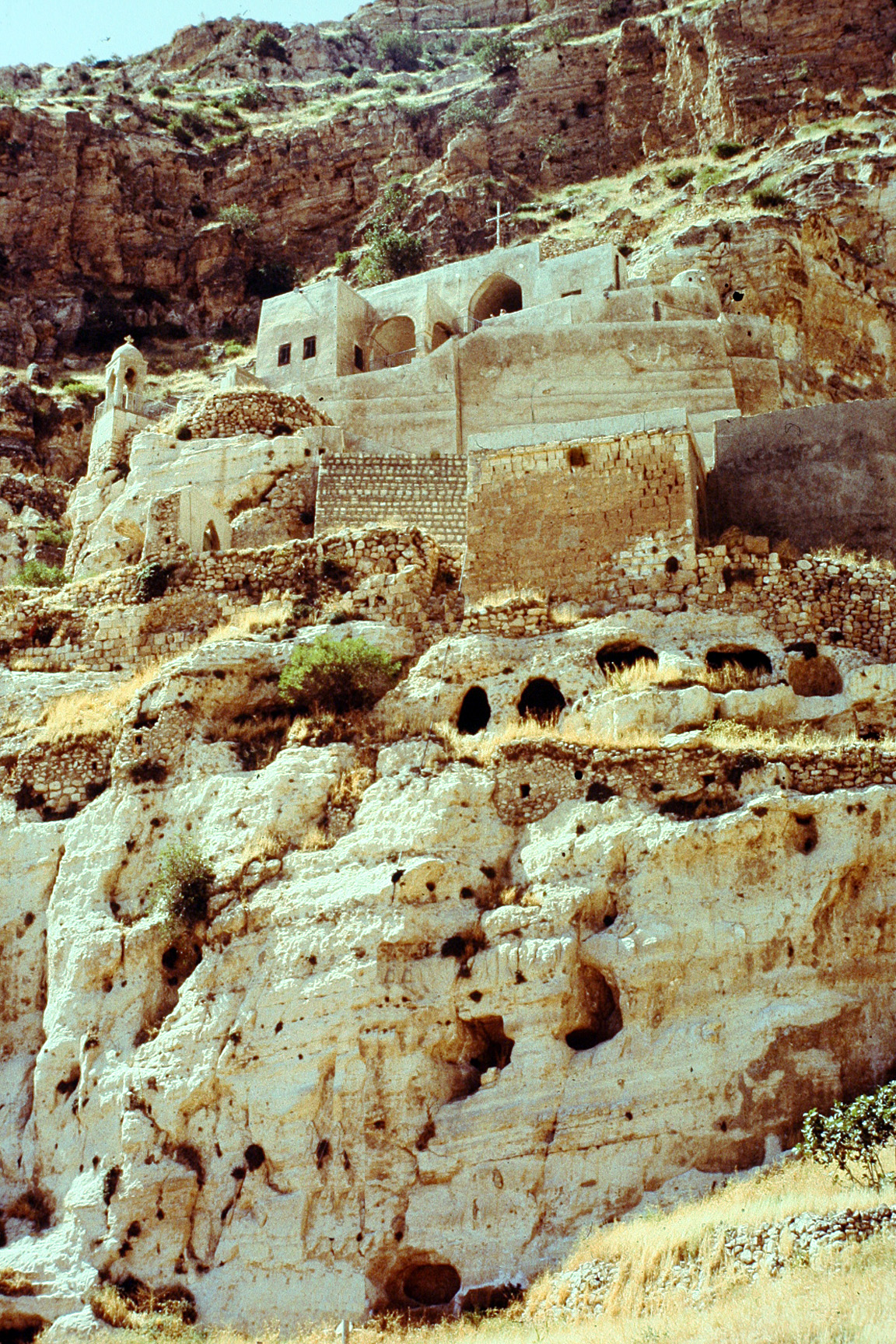
Rabban Hormizd Monastery, residence of the Eliya line patriarchs

The traditionalist patriarch Shemʿon VII Ishoʿyahb (1539–1558), who resided in the monastery of Rabban Hormizd, consecrating two metropolitans, Ishoʿyahb for Nisibis, nominally with jurisdiction also over Amid and Mardin, and Joseph for Gazarta. Ishoʿyahb was probably unable to exercise his authority in Amid and Mardin, both of which had Catholic metropolitans, but Joseph seems to have been accepted in Gazarta. Shemʿon's nephew Eliya remained metropolitan of Mosul and natar kursya, and the Mosul and ʿAmadiya districts certainly remained loyal to Shemʿon VII.

=== The hierarchy of Eliya VI (1558-1591) ===
Patriarch Eliya VI (1558-1591) had a hierarchy of at least six bishops: his brother Hnanishoʿ, metropolitan of Mosul and natar kursya; Yahballaha, metropolitan of Berwari; Joseph and Gabriel, bishops of Gazarta; Ishoʿyahb, metropolitan of Nisibis, and Yohannan, metropolitan of Urmi. Mosul was the chief traditionalist citadel, and Leonard Abel remarked in 1587 that although Sulaqa and his three successors had all been consecrated patriarchs 'of Mosul', none had been able to wrest the city from their traditionalist rivals. It now became customary in the Mosul patriarchate for the patriarch's natar kursya to be also metropolitan of Mosul.

=== The hierarchy of Eliya VII (1591–1617) ===
According to the report from 1610, Eliya VII had six metropolitans (Eliya of Amid, Gabriel of Hesna d'Kifa, Yaʿqob of Nisibis, Joseph of Gazarta, Hnanishoʿ of Mosul and the natar kursya Shemʿon), and nine bishops (Denha of Gwerkel, Yohannan of Abnaye, Ephrem of the Atel diocese of 'Ungi', Ishoʿyahb of Seert, Yohannan of Atel, ʿAbdishoʿ of Salmas, Joseph of Shemsdin, Abraham of Raikan and Abraham of 'the mountains'). This was a considerably larger hierarchy than his predecessors possessed, but all the metropolitans and several of the bishops are attested elsewhere, and there is no need to doubt its genuineness. Some of the dioceses are not mentioned again, and at least one bishop, Ishoʿyahb of Seert, was the nephew and natar kursya of a metropolitan, for whom an ad hoc diocese had to be created.

Other sources mention several other bishops at this period. Although the two reports largely overlap, the report of 1607 mentions several bishops omitted from the report of 1610, including the metropolitans 'Glanan Imech' of Sinjar, Shemʿon of Erbil, Denha of Lewun, Yahballaha of Van and Shemʿon of Albaq; and the bishops Joseph of Nahrawan, Yohannan of 'Vorce', Yahballaha of Berwari and Abraham of Tergawar. The report did not mention their allegiances, but Yahballaha of Berwari is known to have been dependent on Eliya VII, and it is likely that the metropolitans of Sinjar and Erbil were also among his hierarchy. The metropolitans Hnanishoʿ of Van and Abraham of the Persian district of 'Vehdonfores', probably the bishop of Tergawar mentioned in 1607, were present at Eliya VII's synod of Amid in 1616.

=== The hierarchies Eliya VIII (1617–1660) and Eliya IX (1660–1700) ===
Eliya VIII (1617–60) did not consecrate bishops for the historic dioceses of Erbil, Nisibis, and Hesna d'Kifa, probably because their East Syriac communities were no longer large enough to need a bishop, and during his reign the Mosul patriarchate consisted of six metropolitan dioceses: Amid, Mardin, Gazarta, Seert, Mosul and Salmas. Although he corresponded cordially with the Vatican, he was not prepared to abandon the traditional Nestorian christological formula. As Shemʿon X had similar reservations, the Catholic communities in the Church of the East were left without Catholic bishops for several decades.

== Dioceses of the Shimun line, up to 1700 ==
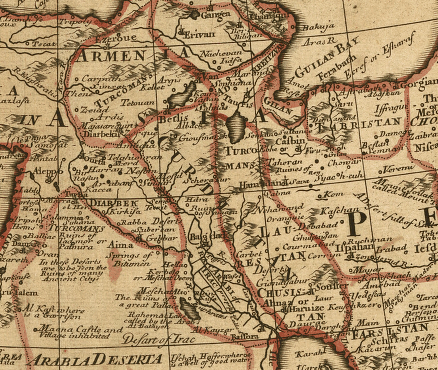
The country of the Church of the East: detail from a map of 1721

=== The hierarchy of Shimun VIII Yohannan Sulaqa (1552–1555) ===
Rome was told that the prime movers in the rebellion in 1552 against the patriarch Shemʿon VII Ishoʿyahb were unnamed bishops of Erbil, Salmas and Adarbaigan, who were supported by many priests and monks from Baghdad, Kirkuk, Gazarta, Nisibis, Mardin, Amid, Hesna d'Kifa 'and many other nearby places'; while according to Leonard Abel, writing in 1587, Yohannan Sulaqa's support came primarily from the towns of Amid and Seert and the neighbouring country districts. Sulaqa is said to have consecrated five metropolitans and bishops during his brief patriarchate. They were almost certainly the metropolitans Eliya Asmar and ʿAbdishoʿ Maron, consecrated by Sulaqa for Amid and Gazarta respectively in 1554, Sulaqa's brother Joseph, consecrated for Seert but soon afterwards sent to India, and the metropolitans Gabriel of Hesna d'Kifa and Hnanishoʿ of Mardin.

=== The hierarchy of Abdisho IV Maron (1555–1567) ===
According to Leonard Abel, ʿAbdishoʿ IV Maron 'created many priests, bishops and archbishops, and many towns of Nestorian Chaldeans previously loyal to his rival placed themselves under his authority'. Abel may have gained this impression from a notorious letter which accompanied a Catholic profession of faith sent by ʿAbdishoʿ to pope Pius IV in 1562. This letter, which survives in three slightly different Latin translations of a lost Syriac original, purports to contain a list of thirty-eight metropolitans and bishops who recognised his authority:

I, ʿAbdishoʿ, son of Yohannan, of the house of Mari of the city of Gazarta on the Tigris river, was once a monk of the monastery of Saint Anthony and of the brothers Mar Ahha and Mar Yohannan, but am now, thanks to God and to the Apostolic See, Primate or Patriarch of the eastern city of Mosul in Athor, under whose jurisdiction are many metropolitans and bishops. These include the metropolis of Arbel [Erbil], and the dioceses of Sirava [Shirawa] and Hancava [ʿAïnqawa]; the metropolis of Cheptian [Telkepe] and the dioceses of Charamleys [Karamlish] and Achusch [Alqosh]; the metropolis of Nassibin [Nisibis], and the dioceses of Macchazin, Tallescani and Mardin; the metropolis of Seert and the diocese of Azzen [Hesna d'Kifa]; the metropolis of Elchessen [Gazarta] and the dioceses of Zuch [Zakho] and Mesciara [Mansuriya]; the metropolis of Gurgel [Gwerkel] and the diocese of Esci [Shakh]; and the metropolis of Amed [Amid] and the dioceses of Chiaruchia [Sharukhiya], Hain and Tannur [ʿAïn Tannur]. All these regions are under Turkish rule.

Also the metropolis of Ormi Superior [Upper Urmi], and the dioceses of Ulcismi and Chuchia; the metropolis of Ormi Inferior [Lower Urmi] and the dioceses of Dutra, Saldos [Sulduz] and Escinuc [Eshnuq]; the metropolis of Espurgan [Supurghan] and the dioceses of Nare [Neri] and Giennum [Gawilan?]; the metropolis of Salmas, and the dioceses of Baumar, Sciabathan [Shapatan] and Vasthan [Wastan]. All these regions are subject to the emperor (or Sophi, as he is usually known) of the Persians.

Furthermore, in India, subject to the Portuguese, are the metropolitan dioceses of Cochin, Cranganore, and Goa; and the diocese of Calicut, which also includes the Coromandel region, still in the hands of heathen natives.

The status of this letter has long been recognised as problematical, as the fourth Catholic patriarch Shemʿon IX Denha had only fourteen bishops in 1580, and it is unlikely that ʿAbdishoʿ had a far larger hierarchy several years earlier. The locations of the fourteen metropolitan sees listed (with the exception of Telkepe) have a certain plausibility, but several of the suffragan dioceses were little more than villages. None of them, as far as is known, had previously been the seat of a bishop, and the bishops they supposedly had in 1562 are not mentioned in any other source. It is possible that ʿAbdishoʿ merely claimed to have fourteen dioceses (the same number as his successor), whose metropolitans or bishops were responsible for the various localities listed under each metropolis, and that the translator misunderstood his meaning. Alternatively, he may have deliberately exaggerated the size of his hierarchy to impress the Vatican. In either case, while perhaps confirming the existence of East Syriac communities in certain districts and villages at this period and indicating the areas where ʿAbdishoʿ claimed support, the letter cannot be trusted as evidence for the number of bishops in his hierarchy.

As a guide to ʿAbdishoʿ's support the letter must be treated with caution. His claim to the western districts (Amid, Mardin and Seert had Catholic bishops, and he also controlled the monasteries of Mar Pethion in the Mardin district and Mar Yaʿqob the Recluse in the Seert district) was perfectly reasonable, and he certainly had two metropolitans in India. His claim to the Erbil, Urmi and Salmas districts may also have been justified, in view of the support for Sulaqa from their bishops. Alqosh, however, was the stronghold of his rival Shemʿon VII Ishoʿyahb, who also controlled Telkepe and Karamlish. ʿAbdishoʿ perhaps felt obliged, as 'patriarch of Mosul', to assert a claim to the Mosul district, and may have had a bishop nominally responsible for the villages of the Mosul plain.

Several metropolitans and bishops mentioned in other sources can be plausibly assigned to ʿAbdishoʿ's hierarchy, and it is interesting to notice that their dioceses match many of the metropolitan dioceses listed by ʿAbdishoʿ in 1562: Sulaqa's brother Joseph, metropolitan of Seert, responsible also for India from 1555; Eliya Asmar, metropolitan of Amid from 1554 to 1582; Abraham, metropolitan of Angamale in India; Hnanishoʿ, metropolitan of Nisibis and Mardin; the future patriarch Shemʿon VIII Yahballaha, metropolitan of Gazarta; Yohannan of Atel and Bohtan (ʿAbdishoʿ's 'Gwerkel'), martyred in 1572; the future patriarch Shemʿon IX Denha, metropolitan of Salmas, Seert and Jilu; and Gabriel (and perhaps his successor Sabrishoʿ), bishop of Hesna d'Kifa.

=== The hierarchy of Shemon IX Denha (1581–1600) ===
The fourth Catholic patriarch Shemʿon IX Denha (1581–1600), under pressure from his Nestorian rival Eliya VII, abandoned the western centres of Amid and Mardin which had supported the union with Rome, and governed his church from the remote monastery of Mar Yohannan in the Salmas district. During his own lifetime he retained the loyalty of the western bishops, and strengthened the hierarchy he had inherited by creating several new dioceses beyond the western districts. His supporters, mentioned in a letter of 1580 to pope Gregory XIII shortly after his consecration, included not only the western bishops Eliya of Amid, Hnanishoʿ of Mardin, Joseph of Seert, Yohannan of Atel and Joseph of Gazarta, (earlier loyal to Eliya VI), but also the metropolitans Joseph of Salmas, Sargis of Jilu, Hnanishoʿ of Shemsdin, ʿAbdishoʿ of 'Koma', three men (two named Denha and one named Addaï) listed merely as metropolitans, and the bishop Yohannan of 'Chelhacke'. 'Koma' was probably the monastery of Mar ʿAbdishoʿ near the village of Komane in the ʿAmadiya district, while 'Chelhacke' may be a deformation of Slokh (ܣܠܘܟ), the Syriac name for Kirkuk.

=== The hierarchy of Shemon X (1600–1638) ===
The allegiance of several districts shifted dramatically on the accession of the pro-traditionalist patriarch Shemʿon X in 1600, who divided his residence between Salmas and Qudshanis. Shemʿon's return to the old faith was welcomed in some districts, enabling him to consecrate bishops for the Atel and Berwari districts, previously dependent on the Mosul patriarchs. On the other hand, the western bishops transferred their loyalty to the patriarch Eliya VII, mainly because he was felt to be more enthusiastic for the union with Rome than his rival, but perhaps also because they did not wish to be governed by a patriarch unable or unwilling to leave the remote Salmas district. These shifts gave the Mosul patriarchate control of a wide swathe of lowland territory stretching from Amid to Erbil, including the important towns of Amid, Seert, Gazarta, ʿAmadiya, Mosul and Alqosh, while Shemʿon X was left with the mountain districts of Bohtan, Berwari and Hakkari, and the Urmi district.

According to the report from 1610, Shemʿon X had only five metropolitans (Hnanishoʿ of Shemsdin, Sargis of Jilu, Ishoʿyahb of 'the Persian borders', Sabrishoʿ of Berwari and the natar kursya Addaï), and three bishops (Joseph of Urmi, Giwargis of Sat and ʿAbdishoʿ of Atel).

=== The hierarchies of Shemon XI, Shemon XII and Shemon XIII ===
The extent of jurisdiction of the Shimun line patriarchs during the tenures of Shemon XI (1638–1656), Shemon XII (1656–1662) and Shemon XIII (1662–1700) is known from fragmentary evidence, including the letter of 29 June 1653 from the patriarch Shemʿon XI to pope Innocent X:

Many indeed are the Chaldean Christians under Mar Shemʿon, in the following regions: Julmar (Julamerk), Barur (Barwar d'Qudshanis), Gur (Gawar), Galu (Jilu), Baz, Dasen, Tachuma (Tkhuma), Jatira (Tiyari), Valta (Walto), Talig (Tal), Batnura (Beth Tannura, i.e. Berwari), Luun (Lewun), Nudis (Norduz), Salmes (Salmas), Albac (Albaq), Hasaph (Hoshab), Van (Van), Vasgan (Wastan), Arne (Neri), Suphtan (Shapatan), Targur (Tergawar), Urmi, Anzel, Saldus (Sulduz), Asnock (Eshnuq), Margo (Mergawar), Amid and 'Gulnca'. In these regions are 40,000 families, all children of the cell of Mar Shemʿon.

As expected, most of the localities listed are in the Hakkari and Urmi districts, but Amid and Van are interesting inclusions. Both districts were dependent on the patriarch Eliya VII earlier in the century, but their dependence around the middle of the 17th century on the Qudshanis patriarchate, probably because of Shemʿon XI's Catholic sympathies, is confirmed by several colophons. With these two exceptions, the Qudshanis patriarchate covered roughly the same area in 1653 as it had in 1610. The figure of 40,000 families seems far too high.

== Allegiance of East Syriac monasteries ==
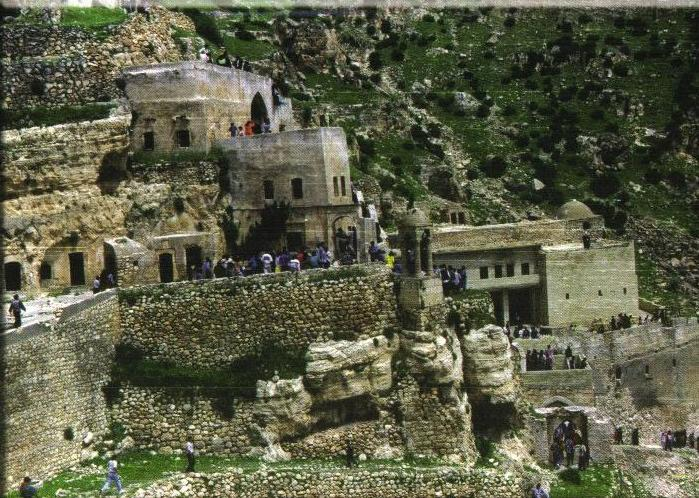
The monastery of Rabban Hormizd, Alqosh

The reports of 1607 and 1610 also mentioned that the Church of the East used to have more than a hundred 'monasteries', and listed more than forty separate buildings still in use at the beginning of the 17th century, most of which can be readily identified. The term 'monastery' seems to have been used by the Vatican scribes to translate the Syriac word ʿumra, which could also mean a large church, and at least eleven of these 'monasteries' (particularly those in the mountainous Hakkari district), were merely churches (Mar Giwargis in Gazarta, Mar Pinhas in Hawsar, Mar ʿAbdishoʿ in Nerem, Mar Tahmasgard, Mar Pethion and Mar Thomas in Kirkuk, Mar Giwargis in Ashitha, Mar Shallita in Qudshanis, Mar ʿAbdishoʿ and Mar Qardagh in Beth ʿAziza, Mar Pethion in Mazraʿa, Mar Zayʿa in Matha d'Mar Zayʿa and perhaps others). Others, however, were genuine monasteries, and manuscript colophons confirm that many of them did indeed have monks at this period.

The genuine monasteries in the two lists (the monasteries of Mar Awgin, Mar Abraham of Kashkar, Mar Yaʿqob the Recluse, Mar Yohannan the Egyptian, Mar Ahha, Rabban Bar ʿIdta, Mar Yaʿqob of Beth ʿAbe, Mar Mikha'il, Mar Eliya of Hirta, Rabban Hormizd the Persian and Mar Sabrishoʿ of Beth Qoqa), all of which had long and proud histories, were all loyal to Eliya VII at this period. The colophons of the surviving manuscripts confirm that monasticism was practised to a significant extent in the Mosul patriarchate up to the middle of the 18th century and that it hardly existed in the Qudshanis patriarchate. About 30 Nestorian monks are known from the monasteries of the Mosul patriarchate between 1552 and 1743 (when the monastery of Rabban Hormizd was temporarily abandoned), and about 150 Catholic monks in the Chaldean monasteries after 1808. Of the many scribes known from the Qudshanis patriarchate, only one, the 19th-century solitary Rabban Yonan, described himself as a monk.

The possession of these important monasteries gave the Mosul patriarchate access to the talents of a literate and educated elite, and the treasures of East Syriac literature preserved in their libraries gave an impetus to the scribal profession and probably encouraged the growth of the great scribal families of Alqosh. There were, of course, literate scribes and priests and old manuscripts to be found in the Qudshanis patriarchate, but far fewer. The existence of an educated elite of scribes and monks, coupled with the descent of its patriarchs from the old patriarchal family, gave the Mosul patriarchs a prestige (fully appreciated by the Vatican) which its Qudshanis rivals could never hope to match.

== Dioceses of the Amid patriarchate ==
The conversion of traditionalist bishop Joseph in Amid to Catholicism in 1672 revived the pro-Catholic movement, that prospered in the western districts after the Ottoman authorities recognised Joseph of Amid as an independent patriarch in 1681. Between 1681 and 1830 there were three East Syriac patriarchates, two Nestorian and one Catholic. For the newly created Amid patriarchate, the 18th century was one of almost unbroken success. At the beginning of the century it had only a single metropolitan, for Amid itself. Although rebuffed in an attempt to consecrate the Catholic priest Khidr metropolitan of Mosul in 1724, Joseph III consecrated metropolitans for Mardin and Seert before his departure for Rome in 1731, bringing over many East Syriac Christians in the Seert region from their previous dependence on the Eliya line, and also secured recognition for the Catholic minorities in Mosul and the villages of the Mosul plain. In 1757 Laʿzar Hindi, the Chaldean metropolitan of Amid, estimated that there were just under 20,000 Catholics in the Amid patriarchate, of whom about 8,000 lived in the Amid and Mardin regions, 5,000 in the Seert region, and 6,000 in Mosul and the Mosul plain. As the East Syriac population of the Mosul patriarchate at this period is unlikely to have exceeded 50,000, of whom perhaps 10,000 lived in the Mosul region, the Catholics were by then probably in the majority in and around Mosul. The scale of the Catholic penetration doubtless encouraged Eliya XI (d. 1778) to open negotiations with the Vatican in the 1770s, and Yohannan Hormizd to convert to Catholicism.

Table 1: Population of the Amid patriarchate, 1757
Diocese	No. of Churches	No. of Believers	Diocese	No. of Churches	No. of Believers
Baghdad	1	400	Mardin	1	3,000
Mosul	6 or 7	6,000	Seert	8	5,000
Amid	3	5,000	Total	19 or 20	19,500

In 1796 Fulgence de Sainte Marie, apostolic vicar of Baghdad, visited Amid and Mosul and recorded the following statistics in respect of the two patriarchates.

Table 2: Population of the Chaldean church, 1796
Patriarchate	No. of Priests	No. of Deacons and Subdeacons	No. of Families
Patriarchate of Amid	35	60	1,061
Patriarchate of Babylon	64	–	2,962
Total	99	60 or more	4,033

== Dioceses of the Elia line, 1700–1804 ==
Given the resources it controlled, it is hardly surprising that the 17th century was a period of solid achievement for the Mosul patriarchate. It recovered their old authority in the western districts, consecrating traditionalist bishops for the Catholic dioceses founded by Sulaqa a century earlier. Scribal activity, previously concentrated in the Gazarta district, shifted to Mosul, to the nearby villages of Telkepe and Tel Isqof, and above all to Alqosh, whose Shikwana and Nasro families emerged in the second half of the century to establish a dominance which was not seriously challenged until the second half of the 19th century.

=== The hierarchy of Eliya XI (1722–1778) ===
By the beginning of the 18th century the Mosul patriarchate had lost its influence in the Catholic strongholds of Amid and Mardin, but still retained the loyalty of a considerable section of the Church of the East which wished to remain Nestorian. It is clear from manuscript colophons that most of the numerous East Syriac villages in the Seert, Gazarta, ʿAmadiya and ʿAqra districts were still Nestorian and loyal to the Eliya line at this period, as were the surviving East Syriac communities in the Erbil and Kirkuk districts. Mosul and several villages of the Mosul plain had important Catholic communities, but the Nestorians remained in the majority, and the monastery of Rabban Hormizd remained a Nestorian citadel until it was abandoned in the 1740s. Curiously, the Mosul patriarchate had very few bishops to administer these large territories. Apart from the patriarch himself and his natar kursya, responsible for the Mosul district, only Gazarta and Seert had bishops at the beginning of the century, and no effort appears to have been made to consolidate the loyalty of other districts by giving them bishops. The policy of Eliya XI seems to have been to preserve the status quo. He responded sharply to an attempt by Joseph III to consecrate a Catholic metropolitan for Mosul in 1724, and after the consecration of the Catholic bishop Shemʿon Kemo for Seert around 1730 sent a Nestorian bishop to the district during Joseph's absence in Rome. On both occasions, however, he was merely reacting to a Catholic challenge. This inertia was an important factor in the ultimate success of the Catholic movement.

=== The hierarchy of Eliya XII (1778–1804) ===
On 11 October 1779 the recently enthroned patriarch Eliya XII Ishoʿyahb wrote to the Qudshanis patriarch Shemʿon XV seeking information for a report to the Vatican. In his letter he mentioned that a synod had recently been held at Alqosh under his presidency, at which the following seven bishops were present: the metropolitan and natar kursya Mar Ishoʿyahb; the 'elderly' Mar Hnanishoʿ, metropolitan of Nuhadra [ʿAmadiya]; Mar Shemʿon, bishop of Sinjar and Mosul; Mar Yahballaha, bishop of Gazarta; Mar Denha, bishop of ʿAqra; Mar Saba, bishop of 'Beth Zabe'; and Mar Ishoʿsabran, bishop of Erbil. This is a puzzling list, as only the metropolitan Hnanishoʿ is mentioned elsewhere, but it may be genuine and reflect a reaction by Eliya XII Ishoʿyahb to the conservative policy of his uncle Eliya XI Denha. The diocese of Beth Zabe, not elsewhere attested, was probably the Tiyari district around the Great Zab, whose most famous church was dedicated to Mar Saba. Although the Tiyari district was under the control of the Shemʿon line by the middle of the 19th century, a number of manuscripts were copied at Alqosh for Tiyari villages in the second half of the 18th century, indicating that they looked towards Mosul at that time. Some of the bishops mentioned may have been young natar kursyas, for whom ad hoc dioceses had to be created until a vacancy in one of the traditional dioceses occurred.

== Dioceses of the Shimun line, 1700-1918 ==
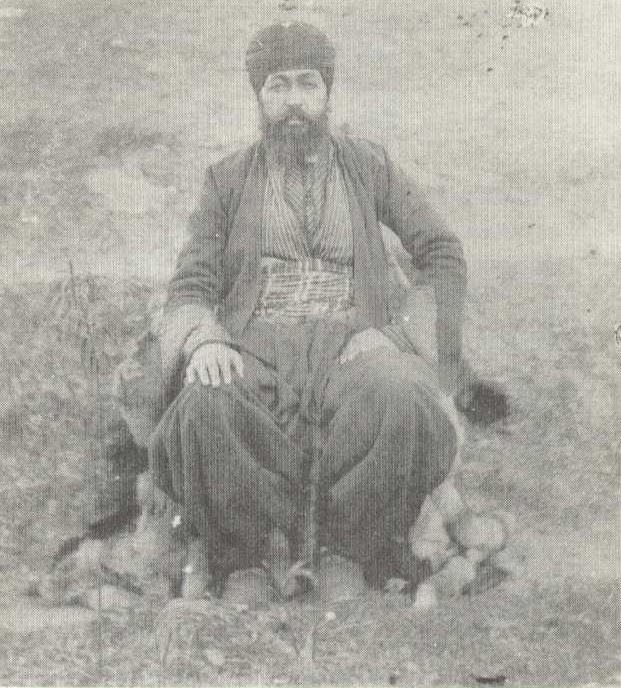
The Nestorian patriarch Shemʿon XVIII Rubil (1861–1903)

A number of bishops of the Qudshanis patriarchate are mentioned in the colophons to manuscripts, and their names and the names of their sees foreshadow the organisation described by western observers in the middle of the 19th century. There are frequent references throughout the 18th century to metropolitans named Hnanishoʿ, who sat at the village of Mar Ishoʿ in the Shemsdin district, and whose jurisdiction covered both the Shemsdin and Tergawar districts. Colophons also refer to bishops of Berwari named Ishoʿyahb, a bishop of Gawar in 1743 named Sliba, and a bishop of Jilu in 1756 named Sargis. Khidr of Mosul mentioned a number of bishops from the Urmi district in 1734, also with names which are paralleled in the 19th century: Gabriel, Yohannan, ʿAbdishoʿ, Joseph, Abraham and Ishaʿya.

Reports made in the 1830s and 1840s by a number of English and American observers (particularly Grant, Ainsworth, and Badger) mention at least fourteen dioceses in the Qudshanis patriarchate. Besides a large diocese in central Kurdistan under the direct control of the patriarch and the diocese of Shemsdin, under the mutran Hnanishoʿ, there were three traditional dioceses in Turkey, Berwari, Gawar and Jilu, whose bishops (Mar Ishoʿyahb, Mar Sliba and Mar Sargis) sat in the villages of Dure, Gagoran and Matha d'Mar Zayʿa respectively. In the 1840s there was also a short-lived Nestorian diocese of 'Zibar and the Mezuri' in the ʿAqra district, whose metropolitan, Mar Abraham, sat in the village of Nerem (Gunduk). This diocese is not mentioned again, and seems to have lapsed after the creation of the Chaldean diocese of ʿAqra. There was also a Nestorian diocese for the Gazarta district, whose metropolitan, Mar Joseph, sat in the monastery of Isaac of Nineveh near Shakh before his death in 1846, and in 1850 there were two other Nestorian bishops in the Atel district, Mar Shemʿon and Mar Thomas. According to Badger the mutran Hnanishoʿ had three suffragan bishops, 'whose dioceses include the districts of Ter Gawar, Mar Gawar, Somâva, Bradnostai, and Mahmedayeh'. One of these suffragans appears to have been Mar Abraham, who sat at the village of ʿArmutaghaj in the Urmia plain and was responsible for a number of villages in the Tergawar district until his death in 1833. Another suffragan bishop, who acted as the mutran's deputy, sat at Tis in Khumaru.

There were also four dioceses in the Urmia district of Persia, whose bishops (Mar Yohannan, Mar Joseph, Mar Gabriel and Mar Eliya) sat at Gawilan and ʿAda in the Anzel district, and Ardishai and Gugtapah in the Baranduz district respectively. While the dioceses of Mar Yohannan and Mar Gabriel each contained numerous villages, and appear to have been traditional, the other two bishops were responsible only for the large villages where they sat, and their dioceses may have been created ad personam.

In the second half of the nineteenth century the Nestorian episcopate continued to develop. In the Urmia district the dioceses of ʿAda and Gugtapah seem to have lapsed on the death of their incumbents. The two principal dioceses, Anzel and Ardishai, continued, and a new diocese was established for the large Anzel village of Supurghan, whose bishop, Mar Yonan, joined the Russian Orthodox Church in 1898. The Sulduz district was detached from the diocese of Ardishai and given its own bishop. Other bishops are mentioned in other sources. In the Bohtan district a Nestorian bishop sat at Eqror, a village not far from Zakho, and another in the monastery of Mar Quriaqos in the village of Elan. In 1891 an unnamed Nestorian bishop is also recorded at Zoghget, in the Arzun district. A Nestorian bishop is also said to have been living in the Berwari village of ʿAqri.

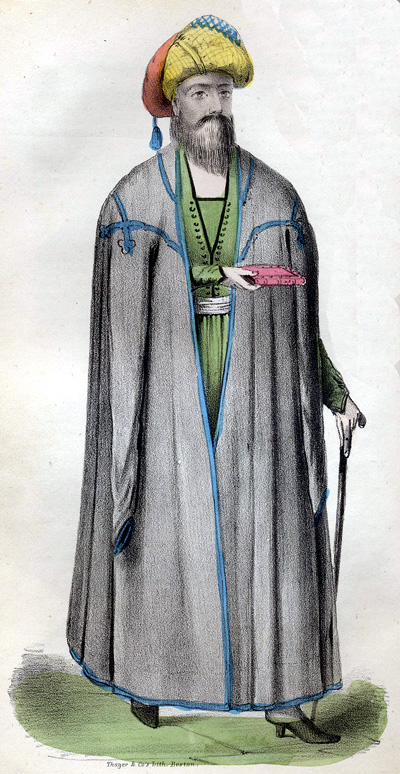
The Nestorian bishop Eliya of Gugtapah, c.1831, as seen by the American missionary Justin Perkins

Reports made in the 1830s and 1840s by a number of English and American visitors (particularly Perkins, Grant, Ainsworth and Badger) mention at least fourteen dioceses in the Qudshanis patriarchate. Besides a large diocese in central Kurdistan under the direct control of the patriarch and the diocese of Shemsdin, under the mutran Hnanishoʿ, there were dioceses for Berwari, Gawar and Jilu, whose bishops (Ishoʿyahb, Sliba and Sargis) sat in the villages of Dure, Gagoran and Matha d'Mar Zayʿa respectively. In the 1840s there was also a short-lived diocese of ʿAqra and Zibar, whose metropolitan Abraham resided in the village of Nerem. The Gazarta district had a metropolitan, Joseph, who had been obliged to withdraw to the monastery of Isaac of Nineveh near Shakh, where he died in 1846, and in 1850 there were two other Nestorian bishops in the Atel district, Shemʿon and Thomas. By 1877 the mutran Hnanishoʿ had three suffragan bishops, probably all consecrated some years earlier, responsible for a number of villages in Shemsdin, Tergawar and elsewhere: Denha of Tis, Yohannan of Tuleki and Sabrishoʿ of Gawar.

There were also four dioceses in the Urmi region, whose bishops (Yohannan, Joseph, Gabriel and Eliya) resided at Gawilan and ʿAda in the Anzel district, and Ardishai and Gugtapah in the Baranduz district respectively. (A fifth bishop, Abraham, resided in the village of ʿArmutaghaj and was responsible for a number of villages in the Tergawar district until his death in 1833.) While the dioceses of Mar Yohannan and Mar Gabriel each contained numerous villages and appear to have been traditional, the other two bishops were responsible only for the large villages where they sat, and their dioceses may also, like the mutran's suffragan dioceses, have been created ad personam. By this period the bishops of the historic dioceses regularly took a distinctive name associated with their dioceses (Hnanishoʿ of Shemsdin, Ishoʿyahb or Yahballaha of Berwari, Sargis of Jilu, Sliba of Gawar, Yohannan of Anzel and Gabriel of Ardishai), and these dioceses were clearly felt to be different from the ad personam dioceses in the Shemsdin and Urmi districts which existed by their side.

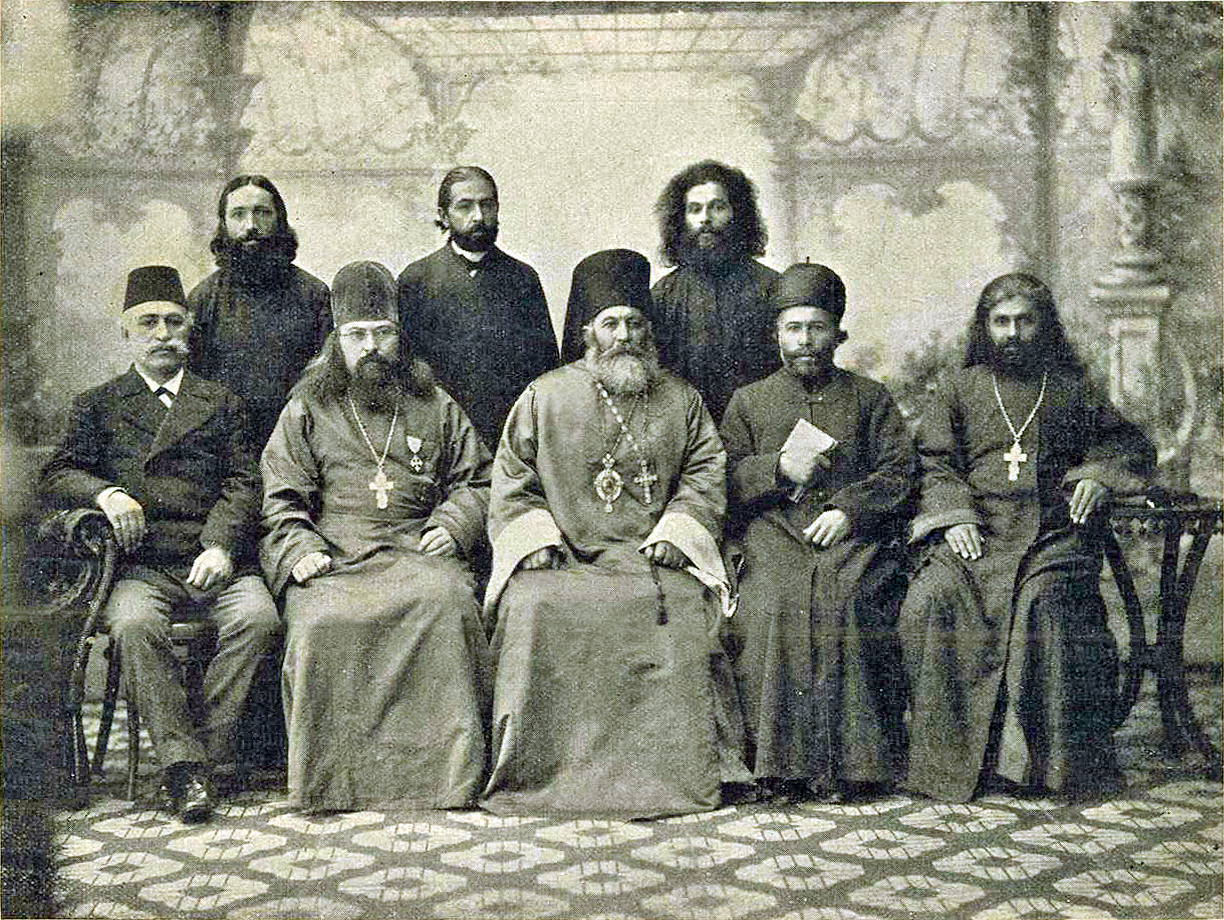
Joining bishop Yonan to the Russian Orthodox Church in 1898. St. Petersburg

The Urmi dioceses of ʿAda and Gugtapah lapsed after the death of their bishops, while a new diocese was established for the large Anzel village of Supurghan in 1874, whose bishop, Yonan, joined the Russian Orthodox Church in 1896 and Russian Ecclesiastical Mission in Urmia was formed. The elderly bishop Ishoʿyahb of Berwari died probably not long after 1850, and by 1868 the Berwari district had three bishops (his natar kursyas Ishoʿyahb and Yahballaha, and a third bishop, Yonan, who resided in the village of ʿAqri). Yahballaha died between 1877 and 1884, and the Qudshanis hierarchy at the end of the 1880s contained twelve bishops: the mutran Isaac Hnanishoʿ (consecrated after the death of his predecessor Joseph in 1884) and the natar kursya Abraham (consecrated in 1883), five bishops in the Hakkari district (Sargis of Jilu, Sliba of Gawar and the mutran's three suffragans, Yohannan of Tuleki, Denha of Tis and Sabrishoʿ of Gawar), two bishops in the Berwari district (Ishoʿyahb of Dure and Yonan of ʿAqri), and three bishops in the Urmi district (Gabriel of Ardishai, Yohannan of Anzel and Yonan of Supurghan).

The diocese of Anzel effectively ceased to exist after its bishop Yohannan left for England in 1881, and the other historic Urmi diocese, Ardishai, came to an end with the murder of its bishop Gabriel in 1896. The (Russian Orthodox) bishop Yonan of Supurghan died in 1908, and in 1913 the Urmi district had three East Syriac bishops, one Russian Orthodox (Eliya of Tergawar) and two dependent on the Qudshanis patriarchate (Denha of Tis and Ephrem of Urmi). There were also several changes in the Hakkari district in the final decades before the outbreak of the First World War. The natar kursya Abraham Shemʿonaya converted to Catholicism in 1903 and shortly afterwards joined the Chaldean church as bishop for the ephemeral Chaldean diocese of Hakkari. The bishop Sliba of Gawar fled to Erivan shortly before 1892 and did not return to his diocese, and the bishop Yohannan of Tuleki died shortly before 1911. In the Berwari district Ishoʿyahb of Dure, after a brief flirtation with the Chaldean church, was replaced in 1907 by Yalda Yahballaha. The bishop Eliya Abuna was consecrated for Alqosh in 1908, and was soon afterwards sent to administer the villages of the Taimar district. Compared with the twelve bishops mentioned by Maclean, Browne and Riley in the 1880s, the Qudshanis hierarchy on the eve of the First World War seems to have consisted of at most eight bishops: the mutran Isaac Hnanishoʿ of Shemsdin; the bishops Yalda Yahballaha of Berwari, Zayʿa Sargis of Jilu, Denha of Tis, Ephrem of Urmi and Abimalek Timothy (consecrated for Malabar in 1907); and, if they were still alive, the bishops Sabrishoʿ of Gawar (last mentioned in 1901) and Yonan of ʿAqri (last mentioned in 1903).

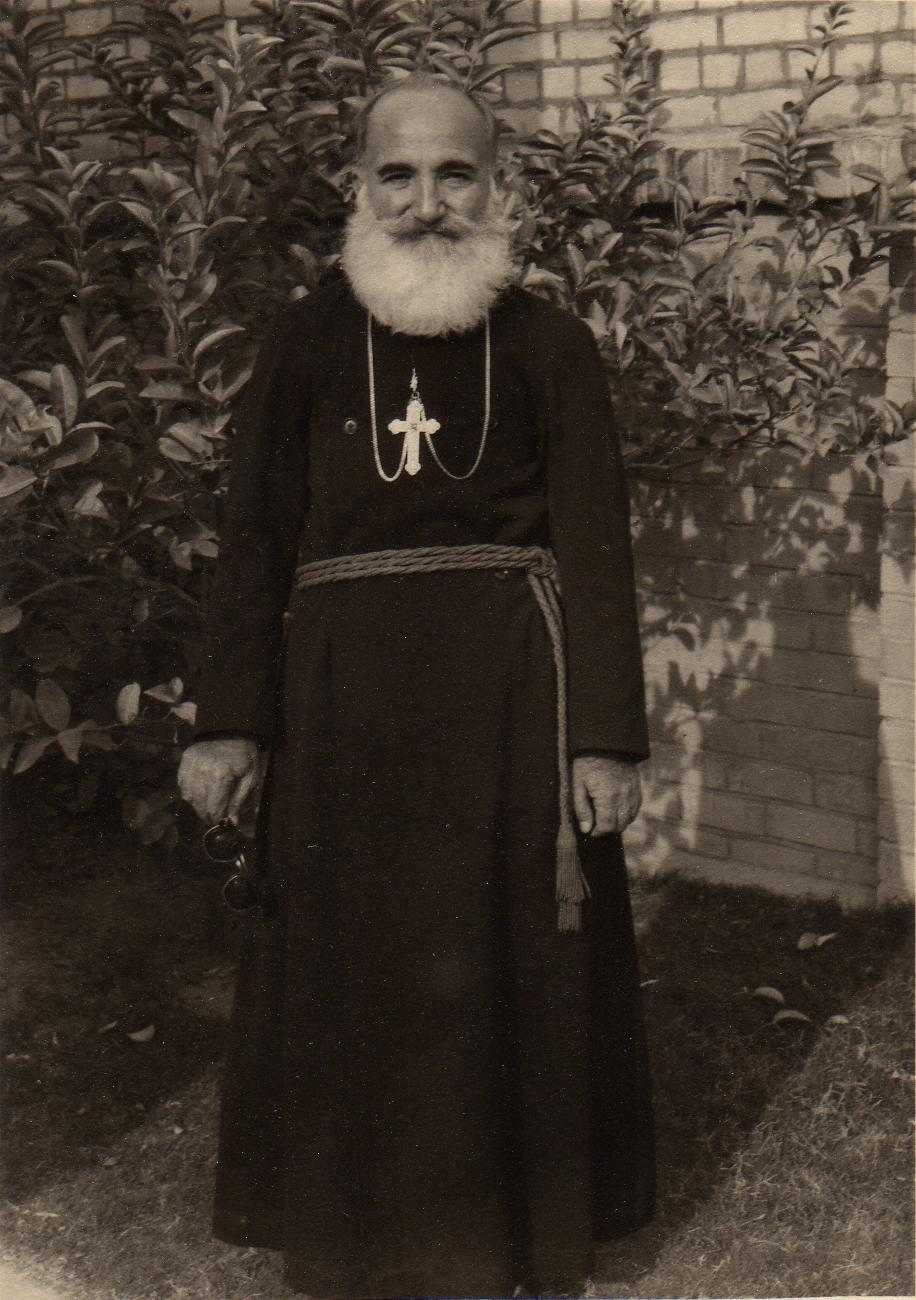
The mutran Joseph Hnanishoʿ (1893–1977)

An article published in 1913 claimed that the Qudshanis hierarchy at that date also included a bishop of Gawar named Sliba and unnamed bishops of Ashitha, Mar Behishoʿ, Walto, Tkhuma, Baz, Tal and Tiyari, and also mentioned that a bishop named Stephen, 'of Zirabad', an (otherwise unknown) village in the Gawar district, had died recently, and that his young natar kursya was then studying in the patriarchal residence in Qudshanis. This list (although cited in Fiey's Pour un Oriens Christianus Novus) cannot be regarded as genuine, as none of these bishops is mentioned by Tfinkdji or by the western missions in Kurdistan before 1914, or by any source thereafter. The course of the fighting in the Hakkari and Urmi districts during the First World War is well documented, and is impossible to believe that nine Hakkari bishops disappeared without trace during this period. In fact three members only of the Qudshanis hierarchy are known to have died during or immediately after the First World War (Denha of Tis in 1915, the patriarch Shemʿon XIX Benjamin in March 1918 and the mutran Isaac Hnanishoʿ in 1919), and the hierarchy of the patriarch Shemʿon XX Paul in 1919 consisted of four bishops: the mutran Joseph Hnanishoʿ, consecrated in April 1919, and the bishops Sargis of Jilu, Yahballaha of Berwari and Abimalek Timothy of Malabar, all consecrated before the First World War.

The first reasonably scientific population estimates of the Qudshanis patriarchate were made in the 19th century, but because in most cases the data recorded not individuals but families (defined normally as six, but occasionally as few as five or as many as ten individuals), attempts to extrapolate a total in terms of individuals could vary markedly. In the 1830s Eli Smith estimated the Nestorian population of the Hakkari region (apparently excluding the Bohtan and Shemsdin districts) at 10,000 families (60,000 individuals), with a further 25,000 Nestorians and Chaldeans living in the Salmas and Urmi districts. In 1850 Badger calculated the population of the Qudshanis patriarchate at 11,378 families, or about 70,000 individuals, of whom 21,000 lived in the tribal territories.

Badger's figures, provided by the patriarch's archdeacon Abraham and reduced by a third as a result of his own observations, are more trustworthy than his low estimates for the Chaldean church. He was unable to supply detailed information on the Shemsdin and Urmi districts, but estimated that there were about 23 villages in the Bohtan district, and supplied the names of 222 villages in the other dioceses.

Table 7: Population of the Qudshanis Patriarchate, 1850
Diocese	No. of Villages	No. of Churches	No. of Priests	No. of Families	Diocese	No. of Villages	No. of Churches	No. of Priests	No. of Families
ʿAqra	15	13	9	249	Gawar	45	34	18	1,082
Berwari	27	20	18	348	Shemsdin and Urmi	–	38	34	4,500
Gazarta	23	23	16	220	Lewun and Norduz	15	9	7	222
Patriarch's	100	75	62	2,778	Jilu	18	14	10	1,168
					Total	–	249	188	11,378

Badger's figures for 1850 are usefully complemented by the statistics provided by Edward Cutts in 1877. Cutts's statistics did not include the Nestorian villages in the Zibar, Berwari and Bohtan districts mentioned by Badger, but gave detailed figures for the villages of the Shemsdin, Tergawar and Urmi districts, for which Badger had no reliable information.

Table 8: Population of the Qudshanis Patriarchate, 1877
Diocese	No. of Villages	No. of Churches	No. of Priests	No. of Families	Diocese	No. of Villages	No. of Churches	No. of Priests	No. of Families
Patriarch's	96	88	81	2,274	Anzel	34	23	22	972
Jilu	21	38	37	1,650	Supurghan	3	2	1	290
Gawar	74	56	43	1,497	Ardishai	90	40	28	2,888
Shemsdin	57	43	36	1,067	Total	375	290	248	10,638

These two statistics, although more than twenty years apart, broadly agree where they overlap, and the 1877 statistics are also in line with the statistics compiled in 1862 by Sophoniah for the Urmi district. Sophoniah's estimate of 4,050 Nestorian families in the Urmi district in 1862 is very close to Cutts's figure of 4,150 families in 1877. Given the broad agreement of these three separate sources, a rough estimate of the total population of the Qudshanis patriarchate in 1877 can be made by adding Badger's statistics for the dioceses of Berwari and Bohtan in 1842 to Cutts's figures for the other dioceses, giving a total of just over 11,000 families, or between 80,000 and 100,000 individuals, living in around 425 villages. With 248 priests, a ratio of roughly one priest for every 400 believers, the Qudshanis patriarchate could not serve its congregations as effectively as the Chaldean church, and nearly half its villages (admittedly the smaller ones) did not have priests of their own.

As with the Chaldean church, the population of the Qudshanis patriarchate (including the Urmi communities which temporarily converted to Russian Orthodoxy) seems to have risen appreciably in the decades before the First World War. A number of contemporary estimates were made, ranging from as low as 18,000 to as high as 190,000, with the majority of estimates falling somewhere between 70,000 and 150,000, and informed opinion favouring a figure of about 100,000. In 1923 Tfinkdji estimated its population in 1914 at about 95,000 (60,000 in Turkey and 30,000 in Persia). The evidence of two surveys of 1900 and 1914 suggests that the true figure may have been between 100,000 and 120,000. The provincial government of Van estimated that there were 97,040 East Syriacs in the sanjak of Hakkari in 1900, and the East Syriac priest Benjamin Kaldani estimated the East Syriac population of the Urmi district at 6,155 families (about 30,000 individuals) in 1914. The 1900 official statistics probably include several thousand Chaldeans, and Kaldani's figures include a number of Chaldean villages in the Salmas district. Allowing for the necessary deductions, the total population of the Qudshanis patriarchate on the eve of the First World War may have been between 100,000 and 120,000. If so, it was still slightly larger than the Chaldean church, but the gap was narrowing.

== Dioceses of the Chaldean Catholic Church, 1830–1918 ==
=== The hierarchy of Yohannan VIII Hormizd (1780–1837) ===
During the turbulent reign of Yohannan Hormizd (1780–1830 as patriarchal administrator, and 1830–1837 as patriarch) Catholic metropolitans were consecrated for ʿAmadiya, Kirkuk and Salmas, and a Nestorian metropolitan of Gazarta consecrated by Eliya XI was supplanted by the Catholic metropolitan Giwargis Di Natale. From 1812 onwards, during Yohannan's suspension, the Amid and Mosul patriarchates were effectively governed as a single entity by the patriarchal administrator Augustine Hindi. In 1830 the patriarchates were united, giving Yohannan Hormizd a hierarchy of eight dioceses with Catholic bishops: Amid, Mardin, Seert, Gazarta, Mosul, ʿAmadiya, Kirkuk and Salmas. The task for the Chaldean church thereafter was to consolidate its position in the border districts of (Gazarta, ʿAmadiya and ʿAqra), many of whose villages were still Nestorian and wished to remain so. Around the middle of the 19th century several villages in the Gazarta and ʿAqra districts were willing to follow Nestorian bishops supported by the Qudshanis patriarch Shemʿon XVII Abraham, abandoning their traditional loyalty to the Mosul patriarchate.

Despite the internal discords of the reigns of Yohannan Hormizd, Nicholas I Zayʿa and Joseph VI Audo, the second half of the 19th century was a period of considerable growth for the Chaldean church, in which its territorial jurisdiction was extended, its hierarchy strengthened and its membership nearly doubled. In 1850 the Anglican missionary George Percy Badger recorded the population of the Chaldean church as 2,743 Chaldean families, or just under 20,000 persons. Badger's figures cannot be squared with the figure of just over 4,000 Chaldean families recorded by Fulgence de Sainte Marie in 1796 nor with slightly later figures provided by Paulin Martin in 1867. Badger is known to have classified as Nestorian a considerable number of villages in the ʿAqra district which were Chaldean at this period, and he also failed to include several important Chaldean villages in other dioceses. His estimate is almost certainly far too low.

Table 3: Population of the Chaldean Church, 1850
Diocese	No. of Villages	No. of Churches	No. of Priests	No. of Families	Diocese	No. of Villages	No. of Churches	No. of Priests	No. of Families
Mosul	9	15	20	1,160	Seert	11	12	9	300
Baghdad	1	1	2	60	Gazarta	7	6	5	179
ʿAmadiya	16	14	8	466	Kirkuk	7	8	9	218
Amid	2	2	4	150	Salmas	1	2	3	150
Mardin	1	1	4	60	Total	55	61	64	2,743

Paulin Martin's statistical survey in 1867, after the creation of the dioceses of ʿAqra, Zakho, Basra and Sehna by Joseph Audo, recorded a total church membership of 70,268, more than three times higher than Badger's estimate. Most of the population figures in these statistics have been rounded up to the nearest thousand, and they may also have been exaggerated slightly, but the membership of the Chaldean church at this period was certainly closer to 70,000 than to Badger's 20,000.

Table 4: Population of the Chaldean Church, 1867
Diocese	No. of Villages	No. of Priests	No. of Believers	Diocese	No. of Villages	No. of Churches	No. of Believers
Mosul	9	40	23,030	Mardin	2	2	1,000
ʿAqra	19	17	2,718	Seert	35	20	11,000
ʿAmadiya	26	10	6,020	Salmas	20	10	8,000
Basra	–	–	1,500	Sehna	22	1	1,000
Amid	2	6	2,000	Zakho	15	–	3,000
Gazarta	20	15	7,000	Kirkuk	10	10	4,000
				Total	160	131	70,268

A statistical survey of the Chaldean church made in 1896 by J. B. Chabot included, for the first time, details of several patriarchal vicariates established in the second half of the 19th century for the small Chaldean communities in Adana, Aleppo, Beirut, Cairo, Damascus, Edessa, Kermanshah and Teheran; for the mission stations established in the 1890s in several towns and villages in the Qudshanis patriarchate; and for the newly created Chaldean diocese of Urmi. According to Chabot, there were mission stations in the town of Serai d'Mahmideh in Taimar and in the Hakkari villages of Mar Behıshoʿ, Sat, Zarne and 'Salamakka' (Ragula d'Salabakkan).

Table 5: Population of the Chaldean Church, 1896
Diocese	No. of Villages	No. of Priests	No. of Believers	Diocese	No. of Villages	No. of Churches	No. of Believers
Baghdad	1	3	3,000	ʿAmadiya	16	13	3,000
Mosul	31	71	23,700	ʿAqra	12	8	1,000
Basra	2	3	3,000	Salmas	12	10	10,000
Amid	4	7	3,000	Urmi	18	40	6,000
Kirkuk	16	22	7,000	Sehna	2	2	700
Mardin	1	3	850	Vicariates	3	6	2,060
Gazarta	17	14	5,200	Missions	1	14	1,780
Seert	21	17	5,000	Zakho	20	15	3,500
				Total	177	248	78,790

The last pre-war survey of the Chaldean church was made in 1913 by the Chaldean priest Joseph Tfinkdji, after a period of steady growth since 1896. The Chaldean church on the eve of the First World War consisted of the patriarchal archdiocese of Mosul and Baghdad, four other archdioceses (Amid, Kirkuk, Seert and Urmi), and eight dioceses (ʿAqra, ʿAmadiya, Gazarta, Mardin, Salmas, Sehna, Zakho and the newly created diocese of Van). Five more patriarchal vicariates had been established since 1896 (Ahwaz, Constantinople, Basra, Ashshar and Deir al-Zor), giving a total of twelve vicariates.

Tfinkdji's grand total of 101,610 Catholics in 199 villages is slightly exaggerated, as his figures included 2,310 nominal Catholics in twenty-one 'newly converted' or 'semi-Nestorian' villages in the dioceses of Amid, Seert and ʿAqra, but it is clear that the Chaldean church had grown significantly since 1896. With around 100,000 believers in 1913, the membership of the Chaldean church was only slightly smaller than that of the Qudshanis patriarchate (probably 120,000 East Syriacs at most, including the population of the nominally Russian Orthodox villages in the Urmi district). Its congregations were concentrated in far fewer villages than those of the Qudshanis patriarchate, and with 296 priests, a ratio of roughly three priests for every thousand believers, it was rather more effectively served by its clergy. Only about a dozen Chaldean villages, mainly in the Seert and ʿAqra districts, did not have their own priests in 1913.

Table 6: Population of the Chaldean Church, 1913
Diocese	No. of Villages	No. of Churches	No. of Priests	No. of Believers	Diocese	No. of Villages	No. of Churches	No. of Priests	No. of Believers
Mosul	13	22	56	39,460	ʿAmadiya	17	10	19	4,970
Baghdad	3	1	11	7,260	Gazarta	17	11	17	6,400
Vicariates	13	4	15	3,430	Mardin	6	1	6	1,670
Amid	9	5	12	4,180	Salmas	12	12	24	10,460
Kirkuk	9	9	19	5,840	Sehna	1	2	3	900
Seert	37	31	21	5,380	Van	10	6	32	3,850
Urmi	21	13	43	7,800	Zakho	15	17	13	4,880
ʿAqra	19	10	16	2,390	Total	199	153	296	101,610

Tfinkdji's statistics also highlight the effect on the Chaldean church of the educational reforms of the patriarch Joseph VI Audo. The Chaldean church on the eve of the First World War was becoming less dependent on the monastery of Rabban Hormizd and the College of the Propaganda for the education of its bishops. Seventeen Chaldean bishops were consecrated between 1879 and 1913, of whom only one (Stephen Yohannan Qaynaya) was entirely educated in the monastery of Rabban Hormizd. Six bishops were educated at the College of the Propaganda (Joseph Gabriel Adamo, Thomas Audo, Jeremy Timothy Maqdasi, Isaac Khudabakhash, Theodore Msayeh and Peter ʿAziz), and the future patriarch Joseph Emmanuel Thomas was trained in the seminary of Ghazir near Beirut. Of the other nine bishops, two (Addaï Scher and Francis David) were trained in the Syro-Chaldean seminary in Mosul, and seven (Philip Abraham, Yaʿqob Yohannan Sahhar, Eliya Joseph Khayyat, Shlemun Sabbagh, Yaʿqob Awgin Manna, Hormizd Stephen Jibri and Israel Audo) in the patriarchal seminary in Mosul.

=== Chaldean patriarchal vicariates, 1872–1913 ===
Mention has already been made of the patriarchal vicariates created by the Chaldean church for its diaspora in the eastern Mediterranean and elsewhere, details of which were given by Chabot in 1896 and by Tfinkdji in 1913. The first vicariate was established for Aleppo in 1872 by the patriarch Joseph VI Audo, and was followed by vicariates for Constantinople in 1885, Cairo in 1890, Adana in 1891, Basra in 1892, Damascus, Beirut, Teheran and Kermanshah in 1895, Deir al-Zor in 1906, Ashshar in 1907 and Ahwaz in 1909. In 1913 the vicariates of Teheran and Kermanshah were vacant, but there were patriarchal vicars for the other eleven vicariates: Paul David, procurator-general of the Antonine order of Saint Hormisdas, for Rome; Isaac Yahballaha Khudabakhash, formerly bishop of Salmas, for Cairo and the small Chaldean community in Alexandria; Abraham Banna for Ahwaz; Thomas Bajari for Constantinople; Mansur Kajaji for Basra; Yohannan Nisan for Ashshar; Stephen Awgin for Deir al-Zor; Mikha'il Chaya for Aleppo; Joseph Tawil for Beirut; Marutha Sliba for Damascus; and Stephen Maksabo for Adana.

Most of the vicariates were small, with chapels instead of churches, but the Chaldean communities of Cairo, Basra and Aleppo were sufficiently wealthy to build substantial churches. The churches in Cairo and Basra were dedicated to Mar Antony and Mar Thomas respectively. The Chaldean community in Beirut, which had neither a church nor a chapel, worshipped in the city's Syriac Catholic church. The vicariate of Adana had a population of 600 Chaldeans in 1896, many of whom were killed during attacks on the city's Armenian Christians in 1909.

== Post-1918 dioceses of the Assyrian Church of the East ==
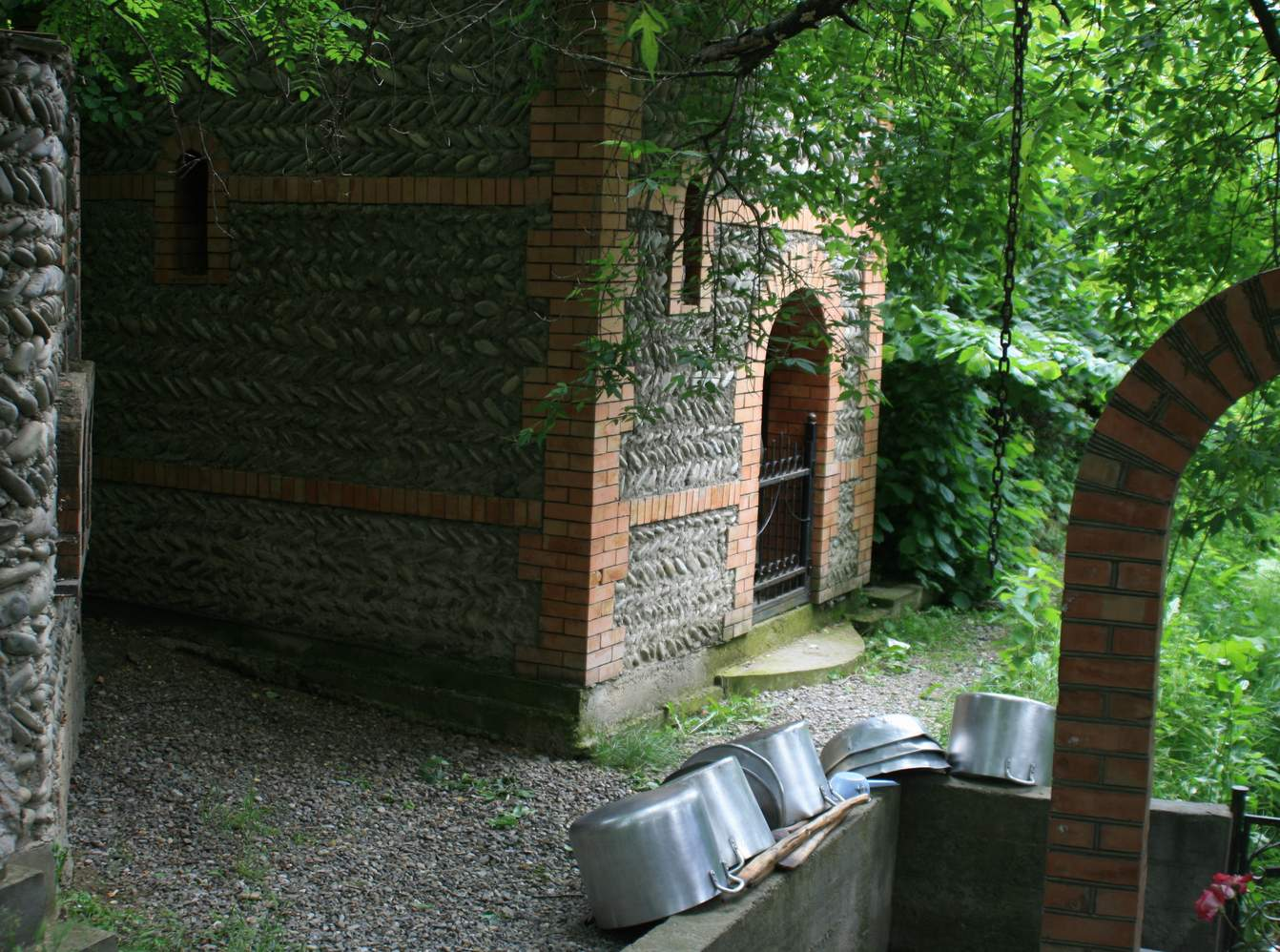
An Assyrian church in Georgia

During the First World War (1914-1918), ecclesiastical structure of the Assyrian Church of the East was severely disrupted. The following period was characterised by the decline of the traditional dioceses in Mesopotamia and the creation of new dioceses for the Assyrian and Chaldean diasporas.

After the death of the mutran Isaac Hnanishoʿ in 1919 and the patriarch Shemʿon XX Paul in 1920, the hierarchy of the Assyrian Church of the East consisted of five bishops: the mutran Joseph Hnanishoʿ; Abimalek Timothy, metropolitan of India; Zayʿa Sargis, metropolitan of Jilu, Raikan and Baz; Yalda Yahballaha, bishop of Berwari; and Eliya Abuna, formerly bishop of Alqosh and then Taimar. This hierarchy persisted until the end of the Second World War.

Mar Abimalek Timothy died in 1945, and was succeeded as metropolitan of India by Thomas Darmo. Mar Yalda Yahballaha died in 1950, and was succeeded as bishop of Berwari in 1957 by his nephew Andrew Yahballaha, who died in 1973 and was not replaced. Mar Zayʿa Sargis died in 1951, and was succeeded as bishop of Jilu by Mar Ishoʿ Sargis, who died in 1966. Mar Eliya Abuna joined the Chaldean church in 1921, and died in 1956. Mar Joseph Hnanishoʿ died in 1977, and the office of mutran lapsed on his death. Two other bishops were consecrated during the 1950s and early 1960s, Mar Philip Yohannan in 1953 for Rawanduz and Mar Hnanya Dinkha, the present patriarch, in 1962 for Teheran.

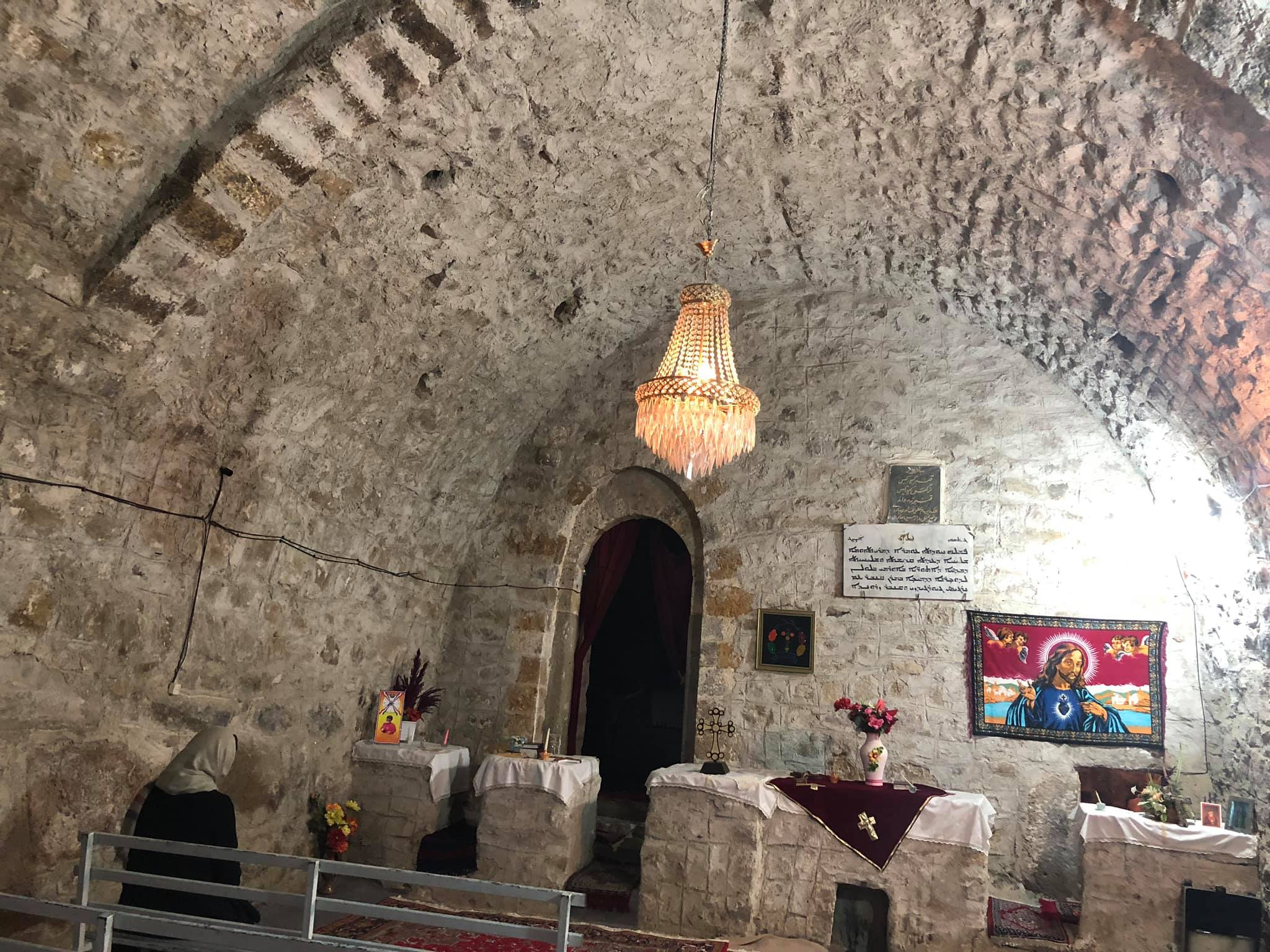
Assyrian Mar Toma church near Urmia, Iran.

The present Assyrian ecclesiastical hierarchy reflects the changing distribution of Nestorian Christians as a result of emigration after the First World War. The Assyrian community, which numbered in total about 500,000 in 1980, still has many members living in Iraq and Iran, but their greatest concentration is in the United States, especially in Chicago, where Dinkha IV now resides. This latter group is mainly composed of immigrants who left Iraq after 1933, and their descendants. There are also significant Assyrian groups in Canada, Australia, the United Kingdom, France, the Netherlands, Denmark and Sweden. Small Assyrian communities also exist in parts of the former Soviet Union, descendants of the Assyrians who migrated to Georgia in the second half of the eighteenth century, and of those Urmi Nestorians who migrated to Yerevan in the 1820s. There is also a substantial Assyrian diaspora in the Middle East outside Iraq and Iran, principally in Syria, Lebanon, and Turkey.

Since the schism of 1969 the Assyrian Church of the East has been divided into two groups (Assyrian Church of the East and Ancient Church of the East). In 1990 Mar Dinkha's hierarchy (i.e. Assyrian Church of the East, including Chaldean Syrian Church) consisted of the following bishops:

- Mar Joseph Sargis, bishop of Jilu, Raikan and Baz (consecrated on 2 March 1968);
- Mar Timothy, Metropolitan of Trichur (consecrated on 10 October 1970);
- Mar Narsaï Eliya d'Baz, metropolitan of Lebanon and Europe (consecrated in 1971);
- Mar Ephrem Hormizd Khamis, bishop of the Eastern United States (consecrated in 1972);
- Mar Giwargis Sliba, Metropolitan of Iraq (consecrated on 14 June 1981);
- Mar Bawaï Ashur Soro, Bishop of the Western United States (consecrated on 14 October 1984); and
- Mar Milis Joseph Zayʿa, bishop of Australia (consecrated on 14 October 1984).
- Mar Emmanuel Rihana, bishop of the Canada (consecrated on 3 June 1990)

Besides the bishops mentioned in this list, Fiey also mentions Mar Yohannan Abraham, bishop of Khabur, Gazarta and Syria since 1968, who resides in Hassakeh and looks after the Syriac communities of the Khabur valley. Dinkha IV has also recently consecrated a bishop of Europe, Mar Odisho Abraham. Two other bishops, Nicholas Baso and Claudio Vettorazo, residing in Sicily and in Aquileia in northern Italy respectively, have also been connected with Mar Dinkha's group in the past, though their present status is uncertain. A bishop named Yaʿqob Barclay has also been recognised recently by Dinkha IV as bishop of Jerusalem.

In 1999 Mar Aprim Nathaniel was consecrated bishop for the vacant Diocese of Syria. In the same year, the Dohuk and Arbil governorates were detached from the Archdiocese of Iraq under Mar Gewargis Sliwa and a new bishop was consecrated, Mar Isaac Yousif with residence in Dohuk. Further more, both the Iraqi bishops were made responsible for the pastoral care of Assyrians in Russia, Armenia, Georgia and Ukraine. Mar Yosip Sargis has been based in Modesto California since 2002 and has since retired.

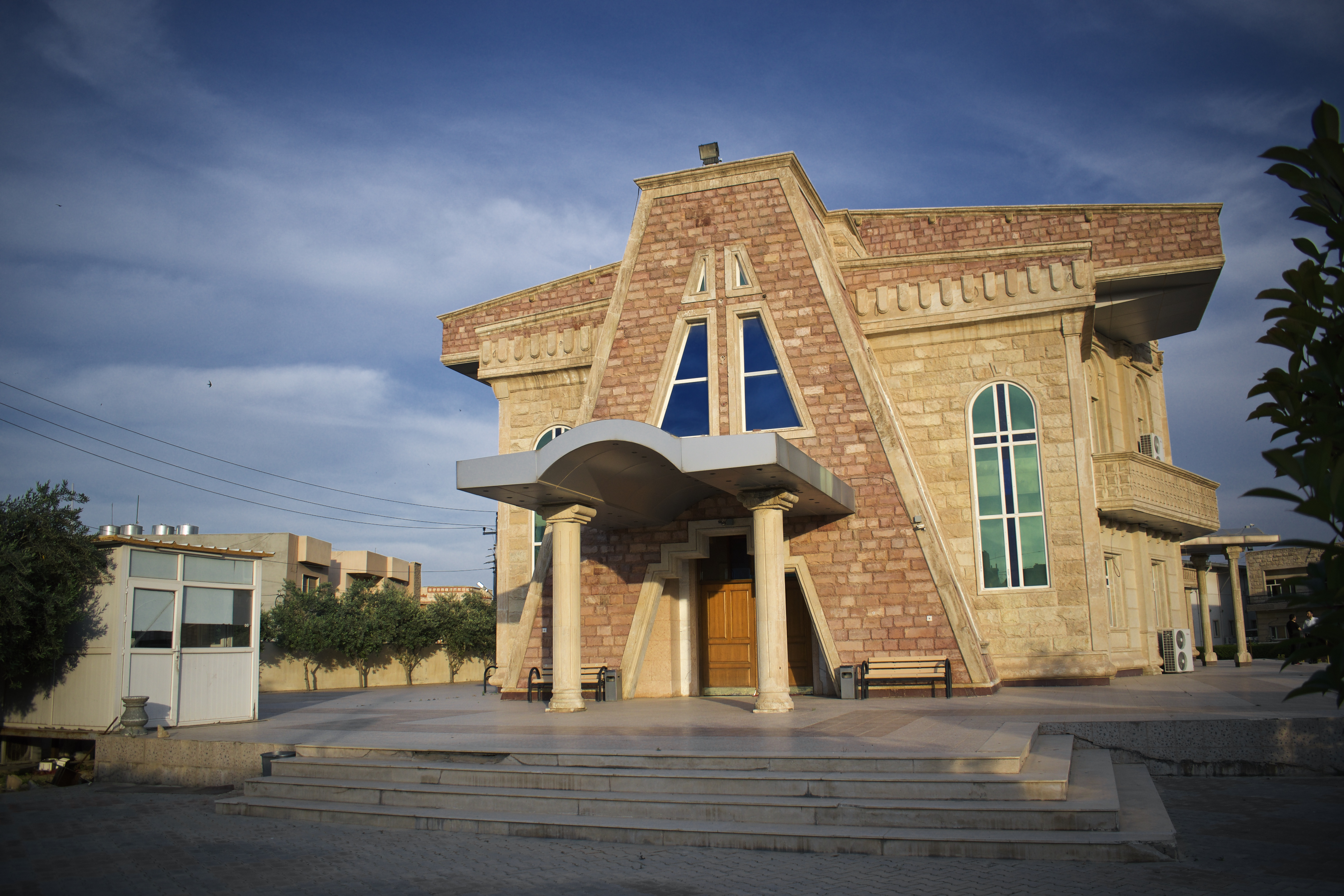
Cathedral of Saint John the Baptist in Ankawa: The Patriarchal see of the Assyrian Church of the East.

Mar Bawai Soro of Western California was suspended in 2005, and he was replaced by a new bishop for California, Mar Awa Royel in 2008. Mar Narsai DeBaz of Lebanon died in 2010 and since then the diocese has been under the pastoral care of Mar Meelis Zaia. The Indian Archdiocese also saw the consecration of two new bishops in 2010, Mar Yohannan Joseph and Mar Awgin Kuriakose. In the same year a new bishop was consecrated for Iran, Mar Narsai Benjamin.

Mar Paulus Benjamin was consecrated as bishop of Eastern United States in 2012.

The Ancient Church of the East appeared as a result of a schism in the Church under Mar Shimun. The then suspended metropolitan of India Mar Thoma Darmo was invited to Baghdad in 1968 by Col. Yosip Khoshaba. Together they created the Ancient Church of the East. Shlemun Giwargis was consecrated Mar Addai as Metropolitan of Baghdad, George Mooken was consecrated Mar Aprem as Metropolitan of India and Mar Poulose Bishop of India. In December 1969, Mar Addai ordained Mar Narsai Toma as Metropolitan of Kirkuk and Mar Toma Giwargis as Metropolitan of Mosul.

Mar Daniel Yakob, who had been consecrated bishop in the new calendar branch by Mar Yosip Khnanisho in 1973, had left his diocese in Kirkuk during the early 1980s and he was accepted into the church and appointed bishop for USA and Canada. Mar Yakob Daniel was consecrated bishop for Syria, and elevated as Metropolitan in December 1995. He was transferred to Australia and New Zealand in July 2005. Mar Emmanuel Elia was consecrated patriarchal auxiliary in 1993 and he transferred to USA in 1994 until his resignation in 2011. Mar Timotheus Shallita from the family of Mar Yawallaha of Barwar who had been consecrated by the Syriac Orthodox Church in 1958, was accepted a metropolitan in 1995 and appointed to Europe. Mar Shallita Shallita and Mar Toma Giwargis later retired in 2012.

In April 2009 two bishops were consecrated namely Mar Zaia Khoshaba for Baghdad and Mar Aprem David for Dohuk, the latter who resigned in 2011. In August 2011 Mar Mari Emmanuel was consecrated bishop for Sydney. Mar Gewargis Younan was consecrated bishop for Chicago in June 2014, and shortly afterwards, Mar Zaia was elevated as Metropolitan for North America. Mar Narsai Toma died in 2014 as Metropolitan of Kirkuk.

In 1990 Mar Addaï's hierarchy (i.e. Ancient Church of the East) consisted of the following bishops:

- Mar Aprem Mooken, metropolitan of Trichur, India (consecrated on 22 September 1968);
- Mar Narsaï Thomas, metropolitan of Kirkuk (consecrated in December 1969);
- Mar Thomas Giwargis Soro, metropolitan of Mosul (consecrated in December 1969, appointed in 1972);
- Mar Paul, bishop of Trichur (consecrated on 13 September 1968); and
- Mar Daniel Yaʿqob, bishop of the United States (consecrated in 1973).

As of 2014 Mar Addai's hierarchy (i.e. Ancient Church of the East) consists of the following bishops:

- Mar Yacoub Daniel, metropolitan of Australia and New Zealand
- Mar Zaia Khoshaba, Metropolitan for North America
- Mar Gewargis Younan, bishop for Chicago

The Assyrian Church of the East, which after several decades of being located in the United States, has decided to move their Patriarchal see to Ankawa.

== Post-1918 dioceses of the Chaldean Catholic Church ==
On the eve of the First World War, in 1913, the Chaldean Church was organised into a patriarchal archdiocese of Mosul and Baghdad, four archdioceses (Amid, Kirkuk, Seert and Urmi) and eight dioceses (ʿAqra, ʿAmadiya, Gazarta, Mardin, Salmas, Sehna, Van and Zakho). There were also a number of patriarchal vicariates for isolated communities in Egypt, Syria, Turkey, Persia and southern Iraq.

Many of the Chaldean dioceses suffered terrible hardship and persecution during the First World War. In 1928, according to an official statistic prepared by the Sacred Congregation pro Ecclesia Orientali, the Chaldean church (excluding the vicariates) had fewer than 44,000 members, compared with over 101,000 in 1913. The dioceses of Kirkuk and Sehna, well to the southeast of the war zone, escaped relatively unscathed, but all the other Chaldean dioceses had lost more than half their Christian population as a result of the war. In the patriarchal archdiocese of Mosul, the largest of the Chaldean dioceses, there were only 18,350 Chaldeans in 1928, compared with just under 32,000 in 1913. In the dioceses of Zakho and (ʿAmadiya there were also heavy losses, though their extent was concealed in the 1928 statistics because these two dioceses were at that time supporting a substantial Chaldean refugee population. In the dioceses of Van, Amid, Seert, Gazarta, Mardin and Salmas, the losses were simply catastrophic. These six dioceses could muster only 4,500 Chaldeans in 1928, compared with 33,840 in 1913.

Table 1: Population of the Chaldean Church, 1928

Diocese	No. of Villages	No. of Priests	No. of Believers
Mosul and Baghdad	10	50	18,350
ʿAmadiya	18	22	3,765
Amid	1	3	500
Kirkuk	7	18	4,800
Seert	-	-	1,600
Urmi	10	10	2,500
ʿAqra	-	-	1,000

Diocese	No. of Villages	No. of Churches	No. of Believers
Gazarta	-	-	1,600
Mardin	1	2	400
Salmas	1	1	400
Sehna	3	5	894
Van	-	-	-
Zakho	16	18	8,000
Total	137	129	43,809

These heavy losses were reflected in a number of changes in the traditional episcopal hierarchy of the Chaldean church. In 1915 Yaʿqob Awgin Manna, patriarchal vicar of Van, left the district, and after the subsequent massacre of the Christians in the Van region the vicariate was not revived at the end of the war. Addaï Scher, archbishop of Seert, and Philip Yaʿqob Abraham, archbishop of Gazarta, were both killed in 1915, and neither diocese was revived after the war. In 1929 the Chaldean archdiocese of Amid lapsed on the death of its last archbishop, Shlemun Mushe al-Sabbagh. In 1930 the old diocese of Salmas was joined with the archdiocese of Urmi, established in 1890.

At the same time, new arrangements were required for the growing Chaldean diaspora in Syria and Lebanon. Patriarchal vicariates had been established before the First World War for the Chaldean communities in Aleppo, Damascus and Deir al-Zor. There was also a Chaldean community in Alexandretta, and after the First World War a single patriarchal vicariate of Syria was created for these four communities. In 1937 this vicariate numbered 3,326 Chaldeans, 6 priests and 4 churches. Substantial numbers of Assyrians and Chaldeans left Iraq in the 1930s and were resettled in the Khabur valley in northern Syria, and a new Chaldean diocese of Syria and Lebanon was created for these communities and for the Chaldeans of Beirut. The first bishop of Syria and Lebanon was Gabriel Naʿmo, who sat from 1939 to 1957 at Aleppo. In 1937 the diocese contained 3,107 Chaldeans, with 11 priests and 2 churches.

According to figures published in 1938 by Stephen Kajo, the patriarchal vicar of Mosul, the population of the Chaldean church was just over 140,000 in 1937. This is a surprisingly high figure compared with the 1928 statistics, but it may be possible to reconcile the two figures. The 1928 estimate, made under difficult circumstances with a considerable number of Chaldean Christians displaced in refugee camps, may well have underestimated the true strength of the Chaldean church in Mesopotamia, and did not take account of the large Chaldean emigration after the First World War. The 1937 statistic, on the other hand, included a significant number of East Syriac Christians who were only nominally Chaldean or who had very recently converted. The statistic counted as Chaldean not only the traditional pre-1914 Chaldean villages, but also a number of villages in the Zakho, ʿAqra, ʿAmadiya and Berwari districts, previously Nestorian in sympathy. These villages were resettled after 1918 by Assyrian refugees (most of whom would have been Nestorians), and appear to have received Chaldean priests shortly afterwards.

Table 2: Population of the Chaldean Church, 1937

Diocese	No. of Churches	No. of Priests	No. of Believers
Baghdad and Basra	6	13	29,578
Mosul	24	40	44,314
Kirkuk	8	18	7,620
Zakho	16	18	10,852
ʿAmadiya	16	17	5,457
ʿAqra	13	5	2,779
Urmi	-	-	6,000
Salmas	-	4	3,350

Diocese	No. of Churches	No. of Churches	No. of Believers
Amid	1	1	315
Mardin	1	1	400
Seert	0	0	3,500
Gazarta	1	1	2,250
Syria and Lebanon	2	11	3,107
Vicariates	8	14	9,177
Emigration	0	4	9,889
Sehna	2	5	1,932
Total	98	163	140,720

At the start of the Second World War the Chaldean patriarch resided in Baghdad, and his episcopate consisted of four archdioceses (Kirkuk, Sehna, Basra, and Urmi-Salmas) and six dioceses (ʿAmadiya, ʿAqra, Mardin, Mosul, Syria and Lebanon, and Zakho). There were also patriarchal vicariates for Syria, Turkey and Egypt.

There have been a number of other changes to the hierarchy of the Chaldean church in the last half century. The diocese of Mardin ceased to exist in 1941 after the death of its last bishop, Israel Audo. In 1957 the diocese of Syria and Lebanon was broken up. A new diocese of Aleppo was created for Syria, while the Chaldeans of Beirut were given a coadjutor, with the titular rank of bishop and the right of succession. (The patriarch Raphael I Bidawid was coadjutor of Beirut from 1966 to 1989.) In 1960 a new diocese was created for Alqosh. In 1962 Baghdad was placed under a patriarchal auxiliary, with the titular rank of bishop. In January 1966 an archdiocese was established for Ahwaz in southern Iran, where a significant number of Chaldeans were employed in the oil industry. In 1968 Erbil was detached from the diocese of Kirkuk and its ancient status as an archdiocese was revived. In 1971 the archdiocese of Sehna was renamed Teheran. This change of name reflected a decision taken three decades earlier by the archbishop Joseph Cheikho of Sehna, who moved his seat to Teheran in 1944 in recognition of the steady growth of the Chaldean population of the Iranian capital.

Until recently the Chaldean church did not appoint bishops for its diaspora, preferring to administer them through patriarchal vicars. This policy gradually changed after the Second World War. The patriarchal vicariate of Turkey, established in 1865, was replaced in 1966 by a diocese at Istanbul. Istanbul is now the only city in Turkey with a Chaldean bishop. In 1980 the patriarchal vicariate of Egypt was also replaced by a diocese at Cairo. In 1982 an apostolic exarchate was established for the United States and a bishop was appointed for the exarchate with his seat at Detroit. In 1987 the small Chaldean community in Australia was under the care of a patriarchal vicar.

=== The Chaldean hierarchy, 1990 ===
The Chaldean hierarchy in 1990 was as follows:

- Raphael I Bidawid, patriarch of Babylon (since 1989);
- Andrew Sana, archbishop of Kirkuk (since 1977);
- Joseph Cheikho, metropolitan of Sehna (since 1944);
- Yohannan Issayi, archbishop of Teheran (since 1972);
- Thomas Mayram, metropolitan of Urmi and Salmas (since 1973);
- Joseph Thomas, archbishop of Basra (since 1984);
- Stephen Babekka, archbishop of Erbil (since 1969);
- Giwargis Garmo, archbishop of Mosul (since 1980);
- Yohannan Zora, archbishop of Ahwaz (since 1974);
- Antony Audo, bishop of Aleppo (since 1992);
- Ablahad Sana, bishop of Alqosh (since 1961);
- Yohannan Qello, bishop of ʿAmadiya (since 1973);
- Ibrahim Ibrahim, bishop of the Eastern United States (since 1982);
- Joseph Abraham Sarraf, bishop of Cairo (since 1984);
- ʿAbdalahad Rabban, bishop of ʿAqra and patriarchal administrator of Suleimaniya (since 1980); and
- Emmanuel Delly, titular archbishop of Kashkar and patriarchal auxiliary of Baghdad (since 1962).

A recently published statistic gave the Chaldean church a total membership of 285,639 in 1995, of whom nearly 150,000 lived in Baghdad and its environs, 21,000 in the Mosul district, and 60,000 in America. According to this statistic the church had 149,220 members in Baghdad, 5,325 in the Kirkuk district, 10,500 in the Erbil district, 4,500 in ʿAshshar and Basra, 20,944 in the Mosul district, 4,500 in Teheran, 1,500 in the Urmi and Salmas districts, 350 in Ahwaz, 10,000 in Lebanon, 500 in Egypt, 15,000 in Syria, 3,300 in Turkey and 60,000 in America.

=== The Chaldean hierarchy, 2009 ===
There have been several changes in the Chaldean hierarchy during the past two decades.

There have been several incumbents of the archdiocese of Erbil since its revival. The archbishop Hanna Marko of Erbil died on 23 October 1996 at the age of 59, and was succeeded by Yaʿqob Ishaq (July 1997–May 1999). After a short vacancy he was succeeded by Yaʿqob Denha Scher on 12 January 2001. Yaʿqob Denha Scher died in office 8 January 2005, at the age of 70. Since then the archdiocese of Erbil has been administered by the bishop Rabban Al-Qas of ʿAmadiya, in the capacity of apostolic administrator.

Yohannan Issayi, archbishop of Teheran, died on 7 February 1999, and was succeeded on the same day by Ramzi Garmo, coadjutor archbishop of Teheran since 5 May 1995.

ʿAbdalahad Rabban, bishop of ʿAqra and apostolic administrator of Suleimaniya, died on 25 July 1999. The diocese of ʿAqra has remained vacant since his death, and the few remaining Chaldeans in the ʿAqra district are now under the care of an apostolic administrator, Father Youhanna Issa.

Giwargis Garmo died in 1999 and was succeeded as archbishop of Mosul in February 2001 by Paulos Faraj Rahho.

In February 2001 Shlemon Warduni was consecrated patriarchal auxiliary for Baghdad by the patriarch Raphael I Bidawid.

Three important appointments were made in December 2001. The elderly bishops Ablahad Sana of Alqosh (ob. 7 September 2002) and Yohannan Qello of ʿAmadiya (ob. 28 February 2007) were replaced by Mikha Pola Maqdassi and Rabban Al-Qas respectively. At the same time Petros Hanna Issa al-Harboli was consecrated bishop of Zakho, after a fourteen-year vacancy in the diocese following the death of its previous bishop Stephen Kajo in December 1987.

In 2002 a new Eparchy of Saint Peter the Apostle, with its seat in El Cajon, California, was created for the Chaldean diaspora of the Western United States. Sarhad Joseph Jammo was consecrated for this diocese on 25 July 2002.

Louis Sako succeeded Andrew Sana as archbishop of Kirkuk on 24 October 2002. Andrew Sana, who retired on 27 September 2003, and died in 2013.

The patriarch Raphael I Bidawid died on 7 July 2003 and was succeeded as patriarch of Babylon on 3 December 2003 by Emmanuel III Delly.

In October 2006 Jibrail Kassab, formerly archbishop of Basra, was consecrated archbishop of Sydney, a new archdiocese created for the growing Chaldean diaspora in Australia and New Zealand. The archeparchy of Basra has remained vacant since this appointment.

Paulos Faraj Rahho, archbishop of Mosul, was kidnapped on 29 February 2008 and murdered either during the kidnapping or very shortly afterwards. He was the most eminent Chaldean victim of the continuing cycle of violence and disorder in Iraq since the American-led invasion of 2003. He was succeeded by Emil Shimoun Nona, whose election was confirmed by the Vatican on 13 November 2009.

In 2010 the vacant diocese of Erbil was assigned a new archbishop, Bashar Matti Warda. Archbishop Hanna Zora, who had taken up residence in Canada since 1991 was formally recognized as head of the newly created Eparchy of Mar Addai of Toronto in July 2011. He retired in May 2014. A successor has yet to be appointed.

Cardinal Emmanuel III Delly retired in December 2012, and he was replaced by Archbishop Louis Sako of Kirkuk in January 2013.

In 2014, the following appointments were made: Yousif Mirkis as Archbishop of Kirkuk & Sulaimaniya, Saad Sirop as patriarchal auxiliary, Habib Al-Naufaly as Archbishop of Basra, Bawai Soro as Auxiliary in the Eparchy of St. Peter in San Diego and the Western United States, Frank Kalabat as Bishop of St. Thomas of Detroit and the Eastern United States. Bishop Ibrahim Ibrahim of the St. Thomas Eparchy retired in May 2014.

The present Chaldean episcopate (November 2009) is as follows:

- Emmanuel III Delly, patriarch of Babylon (since 2003);
- Emil Shimoun Nona, archbishop of Mosul (since November 2009);
- Louis Sako, archbishop of Kirkuk (since October 2002);
- Ramzi Garmo, archbishop of Teheran (since February 1999);
- Thomas Mayram, metropolitan of Urmi and Salmas (since 1973);
- Yohannan Zora, archbishop of Ahwaz (since May 1974);
- Jibrail Kassab, archbishop of Sydney (since October 2006);
- Yaʿqob Ishaq, bishop of the Curia of Babylon and titular archbishop of Nisibis (since December 2005);
- Andrew Abuna, bishop of the Curia of Babylon and titular archbishop of Hirta (since January 2003);
- Mikha Pola Maqdassi, bishop of Alqosh (since December 2001);
- Antony Audo, bishop of Aleppo (since January 1992);
- Rabban Al-Qas, bishop of ʿAmadiya (since December 2001) and apostolic administrator of Erbil;
- Petros Hanna Issa al-Harboli, bishop of Zakho (since December 2001);
- Ibrahim Ibrahim, bishop of the Eastern United States (since April 1982);
- Sarhad Joseph Jammo, bishop of the Western United States (since July 2002); and
- Shlemon Warduni, patriarchal auxiliary of Baghdad (since 2001).

== See also ==
- Numeration of the Eliya line patriarchs

== Sources ==
- Assemani, Giuseppe Luigi (1775). De catholicis seu patriarchis Chaldaeorum et Nestorianorum commentarius historico-chronologicus. Roma.
- Assemani, Giuseppe Luigi (2004). History of the Chaldean and Nestorian Patriarchs. Piscataway, New Jersey: Gorgias Press.
- Babakhan, 'Deux lettres d'Élie XI, patriarche de Babylon', Revue de l'Orient Chrétien, 5 (1900), 481–91
- Badger, George Percy (1852). The Nestorians and Their Rituals. Vol. 1. London: Joseph Masters.
- Badger, George Percy (1852). The Nestorians and Their Rituals. Vol. 2. London: Joseph Masters. ISBN 978-0-7905-4482-3.
- Baum, Wilhelm; Winkler, Dietmar W. (2003). The Church of the East: A Concise History. London-New York: Routledge-Curzon. ISBN 978-1-134-43019-2.
- Baumer, Christoph (2006). The Church of the East: An Illustrated History of Assyrian Christianity. London-New York: Tauris. ISBN 978-1-84511-115-1.
- Benjamin, Daniel D. (2008). The Patriarchs of the Church of the East. Piscataway: Gorgias Press. ISBN 978-1-4632-1105-9.
- Burleson, Samuel; Rompay, Lucas van (2011). "List of Patriarchs of the Main Syriac Churches in the Middle East". Gorgias Encyclopedic Dictionary of the Syriac Heritage. Piscataway, NJ: Gorgias Press. pp. 481–491.
- Chabot, Jean-Baptiste (1896). "Éttat religieux des diocèses formant le patriarcat chaldéen de Babylone". Revue de l'Orient chrétien. 1: 433–453.
- Coakley, James F. (1999). "The Patriarchal List of the Church of the East". After Bardaisan: Studies on Continuity and Change in Syriac Christianity. Louvain: Peeters Publishers. pp. 65–84. ISBN 978-90-429-0735-5.
- Fiey, J. M., Assyrie chrétienne (3 vols, Beirut, 1962)
- Fiey, Jean Maurice (1977). Nisibe, métropole syriaque orientale et ses suffragants des origines à nos jours. Louvain: Secrétariat du CorpusSCO. ISBN 978-2-8017-0061-7.
- Fiey, Jean Maurice (1993). Pour un Oriens Christianus Novus: Répertoire des diocèses syriaques orientaux et occidentaux. Beirut: Orient-Institut. ISBN 978-3-515-05718-9.
- Giamil, Samuel (1902). Genuinae relationes inter Sedem Apostolicam et Assyriorum orientalium seu Chaldaeorum ecclesiam. Roma: Ermanno Loescher.
- Hage, Wolfgang (2007). Das Orientalische Christentum. Stuttgart: Kohlhammer Verlag. ISBN 978-3-17-017668-3.
- Jakob, Joachim (2014). Ostsyrische Christen und Kurden im Osmanischen Reich des 19. und frühen 20. Jahrhunderts. Münster: LIT Verlag. ISBN 978-3-643-50616-0.
- Lampart, Albert (1966). Ein Märtyrer der Union mit Rom: Joseph I. 1681-1696, Patriarch der Chaldäer. Köln: Benziger Verlag.
- Mooken, Aprem, The Assyrians in Iraq: A Travelogue (Trichur, 1990)
- Martin, P., La Chaldée, esquisse historique, suivie de quelques réflexions sur l'Orient (Rome, 1867)
- Mooken, Aprem (2003). The History of the Assyrian Church of the East in the Twentieth Century. Kottayam: St. Ephrem Ecumenical Research Institute.
- Murre van den Berg, Heleen H. L. (1999). "The Patriarchs of the Church of the East from the Fifteenth to Eighteenth Centuries" (PDF). Hugoye: Journal of Syriac Studies. 2 (2): 235–264. doi:10.31826/hug-2010-020119. S2CID 212688640.
- Tfinkdji, Joseph (1914). "L' église chaldéenne catholique autrefois et aujourd'hui". Annuaire Pontifical Catholique. 17: 449–525.
- Tisserant, Eugène (1931). "L'Église nestorienne". Dictionnaire de théologie catholique. Vol. 11. Paris: Letouzey et Ané. pp. 157–323.
- Wilmshurst, David (2000). The Ecclesiastical Organisation of the Church of the East, 1318–1913. Louvain: Peeters Publishers. ISBN 978-90-429-0876-5.
- Wilmshurst, David (2011). The martyred Church: A History of the Church of the East. London: East & West Publishing Limited. ISBN 978-1-907318-04-7.
