= Susuz, Silvan =

Village in Turkey

Susuz
- Neighbourhood
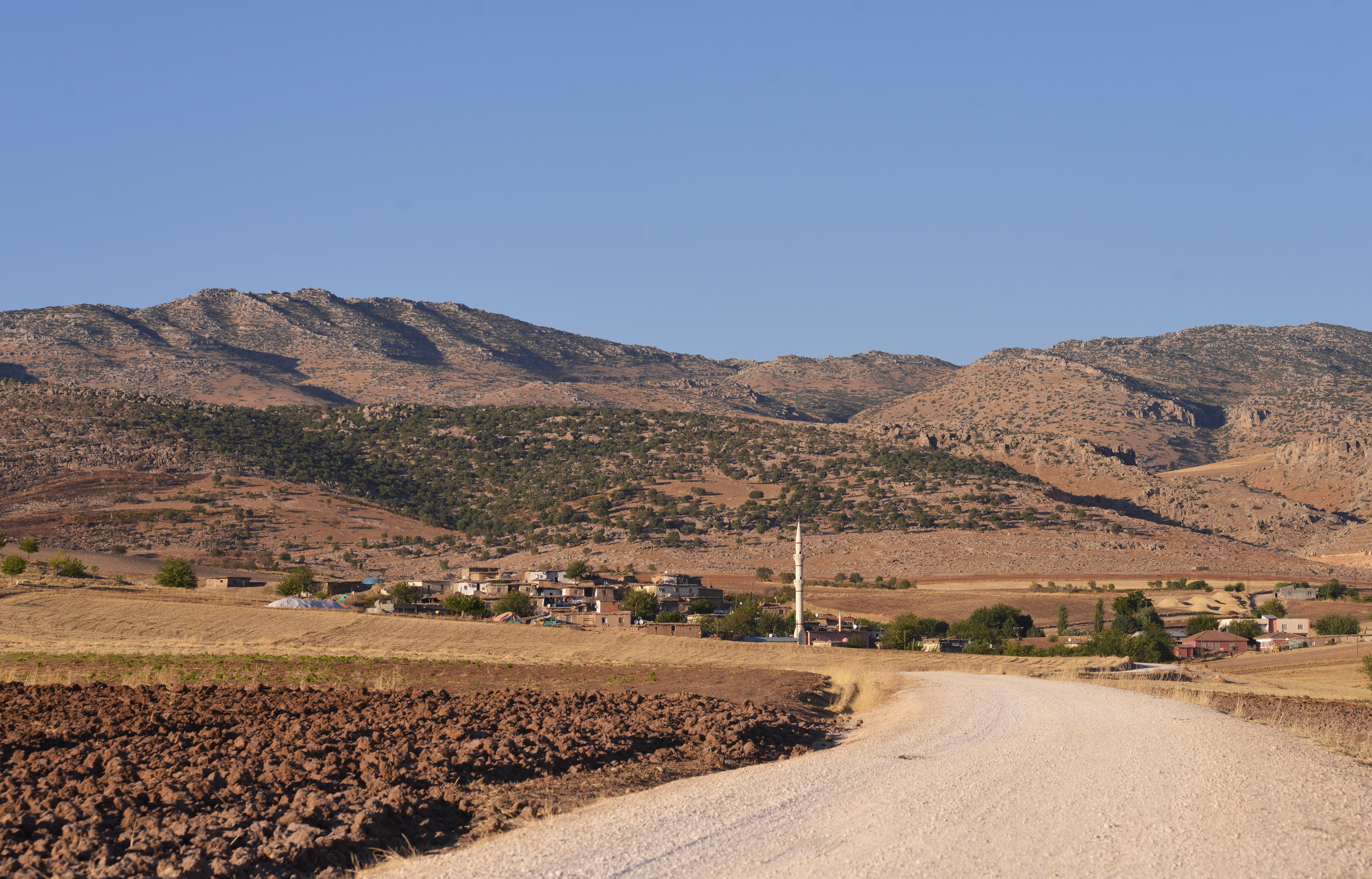

- Location within Turkey
- Coordinates: 38°10′09″N 40°55′46″E
- Country: Turkey
- Province: Diyarbakır
- District: Silvan
- Population (2022): 300
- Time zone: UTC+3 (TRT)

Susuz (Kurdish: Etşa) (Note: Also spelt as Aşta, Attché, Atşa, or Atşo.) is a neighbourhood in the municipality and district of Silvan, Diyarbakır Province in Turkey. It is populated by Kurds of the Bekiran tribe and had a population of 300 in 2022.

== History ==
Etşa (today called Susuz) was historically inhabited by Chaldean Catholics and Armenians. By June 1913, there were 30 Chaldean Catholics at the village as part of the archdiocese of Amida. In 1914, it was populated by 100 Syriacs, according to the list presented to the Paris Peace Conference by the Assyro-Chaldean delegation.

== Bibliography ==
- Bekiran, Mehmet Fatih (2018). Bekiran Aşireti Tarihi (in Turkish). Berikan Yayınları.
- Gaunt, David (2006). Massacres, Resistance, Protectors: Muslim-Christian Relations in Eastern Anatolia during World War I. Gorgias Press.
- Jongerden, Joost; Verheij, Jelle, eds. (2012). Social Relations in Ottoman Diyarbekir, 1870-1915. Brill.
