= Çarıklı, Sur =

Çarıklı
- Neighbourhood
- Location in Turkey
- Coordinates: 37.84026°N 40.23452°E
- Country: Turkey
- Province: Diyarbakır
- District: Sur
- Time zone: UTC+3 (TRT)

Çarıklı (Syriac: Sharūkhīyā) (Note: Alternatively transliterated as Charukiyye, Charukhiyye, Charukhiye, Djarokhié, Garukiye, Jarukia, Tjarchié, or Tjarugiye.) is a neighbourhood of the municipality and district of Sur, Diyarbakır Province, Turkey.

== History ==
Sharūkhīyā (today called Çarıklı) was historically inhabited by Syriac Orthodox Christians and Chaldean Catholics. The village is first attested in 1540 in which year a manuscript was copied for its church of Mart Shmūni. Sharūkhīyā is named as the seat of a bishop in Patriarch Abdisho IV Maron's letter of 1562. In 1606, three pieces of land in the village was donated to the Chaldean Catholic Church of Mār Peṯiōn at Diyarbakır by the deacon Gīwārgīs, son of the notable Salmān. A manuscript was copied for the Church of Mart Shmūni at Sharūkhīyā in 1647. The priest Iyyūb copied a manuscript at Sharūkhīyā in 1653.

The village was plundered during the Massacres of Diyarbekir (1895). It was located in the Diyarbakır central district (merkez kaza) in the Diyarbakır sanjak in the Diyarbekir vilayet in c. 1900. It was populated by 150 Chaldean Catholics and served by one priest and one church as part of the Chaldean Catholic diocese of Amid in 1913. In 1914, it was inhabited by 600 Syriacs, according to the list presented to the Paris Peace Conference by the Assyro-Chaldean delegation. Most of the village's young men were conscripted early on in the First World War.

Amidst the Sayfo, a detachment of the Al-Khamsin militia under the command of Yahya Effendi arrived at Sharūkhīyā from Diyarbakır on 2 June 1915. The village was surrounded by the soldiers and no one was allowed to leave. In the evening, the soldiers seized 35 men from Sharūkhīyā, who were the only men there, roped them together, and told them that they were going to be taken away to build roads. At the village of Gülla, the men were all killed by the soldiers, who played a game of seeing whether one bullet could kill five men if they were standing behind each other. The women and children fled to the Chaldean Catholic church at Diyarbakır.

== Bibliography ==
- Abed Mshiho Neman of Qarabash (2021) [1918]. Sayfo – An Account of the Assyrian Genocide. Translated by Michael Abdalla; Łukasz Kiczko. Edinburgh University Press.
- Courtois, Sébastien de (2004). The Forgotten Genocide: Eastern Christians, The Last Arameans. Translated by Vincent Aurora. Gorgias Press.
- Gaunt, David (2006). Massacres, Resistance, Protectors: Muslim-Christian Relations in Eastern Anatolia during World War I. Gorgias Press.
- Jongerden, Joost; Verheij, Jelle, eds. (2012). Social Relations in Ottoman Diyarbekir, 1870-1915. Brill.
- Wilmshurst, David (2000). The Ecclesiastical Organisation of the Church of the East, 1318–1913 (PDF). Peeters Publishers.
