= Boyunlu, Silvan =

Village in Turkey

Boyunlu
- Neighbourhood
- Location in Turkey
- Coordinates: 38.2280°N 40.9871°E
- Country: Turkey
- Province: Diyarbakır
- District: Silvan
- Population (2022): 1,187
- Time zone: UTC+3 (TRT)

Boyunlu (Kurdish: Boşat; Syriac: Bōshat) (Note: Alternatively transliterated as Başat, Bochat, Bochatt, Boshat, Bouchat, or Bushat.) is a neighbourhood in the municipality and district of Silvan, Diyarbakır Province in Turkey. It is populated by Kurds and had a population of 1,187 in 2022.

== History ==
Bōshat (today called Boyunlu) was historically inhabited by Chaldean Catholics and Kurdish-speaking Armenians. A Parthian-style rock relief of a horseman at the village has been dated to the end of the second century or beginning of the third century AD. The castle at Bōshat is first mentioned in the tenth century, but was likely built before then. A ziyarat in the village is said to have been built in the 13th century.

There were twenty Armenian hearths in 1880. The Chaldean Catholic community in the village is first attested in 1896 by Jean-Baptiste Chabot. By June 1913, there were 500 recently converted Chaldean Catholics at Bōshat who were served by one priest without a church as part of the archdiocese of Amida. The Armenians were killed by the Belek, Bekran, Şegro, and other Kurdish tribes in May 1915 amidst the Armenian genocide.

== Bibliography ==
- Gaunt, David (2006). Massacres, Resistance, Protectors: Muslim-Christian Relations in Eastern Anatolia during World War I. Gorgias Press.
- Jongerden, Joost; Verheij, Jelle, eds. (2012). Social Relations in Ottoman Diyarbekir, 1870-1915. Brill.
- Kévorkian, Raymond H. (2006). "Demographic Changes in the Armenian Population of Diarbekir, 1895-1914". In Richard G. Hovannisian (ed.). Armenian Tigranakert/Diarbekir and Edessa/Urfa. Mazda Publishers.
- Kévorkian, Raymond (2011). The Armenian Genocide: A Complete History. I.B. Tauris.
- Marciak, Michał (2017). Sophene, Gordyene, and Adiabene: Three Regna Minora of Northern Mesopotamia Between East and West. Brill.
- Sinclair, T.A. (1989). Eastern Turkey: An Architectural & Archaeological Survey. Vol. III. Pindar Press.
- Wilmshurst, David (2000). The Ecclesiastical Organisation of the Church of the East, 1318–1913 (PDF). Peeters Publishers.
