= Güçlü, Silvan =

Village in Turkey

Güçlü
- Neighbourhood
- Location in Turkey
- Coordinates: 38°07′38″N 40°54′34″E
- Country: Turkey
- Province: Diyarbakır
- District: Silvan
- Population (2022): 582
- Time zone: UTC+3 (TRT)

Güçlü (Kurdish: Zêrê; Syriac: Zere) (Note: Also known as Chera, Zéra, Zéré, Zeri, or Ziri.) is a neighbourhood in the municipality and district of Silvan, Diyarbakır Province in Turkey. It is populated by Kurds and had a population of 582 in 2022.

== History ==
Zere (today called Güçlü) was historically inhabited by Chaldean Catholics, Syriac Orthodox Christians, and Kurdish-speaking Armenians. There were 25 Armenian hearths in 1880. It was located in the kaza (district) of Silvan in the Diyarbekir sanjak in the Diyarbekir vilayet in c. 1900.

By 1913, there were 120 recently converted Chaldean Catholics at the village who were served by one priest without a church as part of the archdiocese of Amida. In 1914, it was populated by 200 Syriacs, according to the list presented to the Paris Peace Conference by the Assyro-Chaldean delegation. The Armenians were attacked by the Belek, Bekran, Şegro, and other Kurdish tribes in May 1915 amidst the Armenian genocide.

== Bibliography ==
- Gaunt, David (2006). Massacres, Resistance, Protectors: Muslim-Christian Relations in Eastern Anatolia during World War I. Gorgias Press.
- Jongerden, Joost; Verheij, Jelle, eds. (2012). Social Relations in Ottoman Diyarbekir, 1870-1915. Brill.
- Kévorkian, Raymond H. (2006). "Demographic Changes in the Armenian Population of Diarbekir, 1895-1914". In Richard G. Hovannisian (ed.). Armenian Tigranakert/Diarbekir and Edessa/Urfa. Mazda Publishers.
- Kévorkian, Raymond (2011). The Armenian Genocide: A Complete History. I.B. Tauris.
- Tîgrîs, Amed; Çakar, Yıldız (2012). Amed : erdnîgarî, dîrok, çand (in Kurdish).
- Wilmshurst, David (2000). The Ecclesiastical Organisation of the Church of the East, 1318–1913 (PDF). Peeters Publishers.
