= Abraham Shimonaya =

- Bishop of Hakkari
- Church: Chaldean Catholic Church
- Installed: 1903
- Term ended: 1915
- Predecessor: none
- Successor: none

Orders
- Consecration: 1883

Personal details
- Born: circa 1862
- Died: 1915 Hakkari

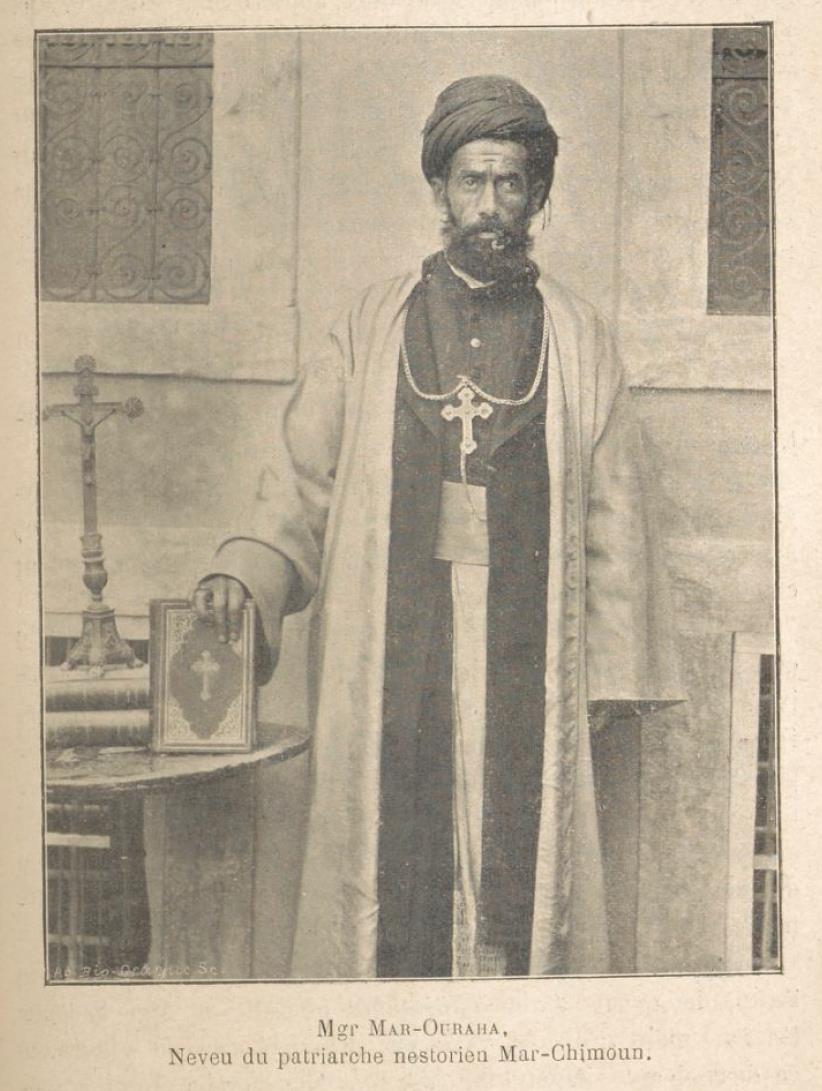
Abraham Shimonaya

Mar Abraham Shimonaya (or Shem'onaya, c. 1862 – 1915) was a bishop of what in 1883 became the Assyrian Church of the East who converted to Catholicism in 1903 and joined the Chaldean Catholic Church. Between 1903 and his death in 1915 he was bishop of the Chaldean diocese of Hakkari.

== Life ==
Abraham Shimonaya, son of Marta, was a nephew of the Nestorian patriarch Shemʿon XVII Abraham (1820–61) and a cousin of his successor Shemʿon XVIII Rubil (1861–1903). The patriarchal succession in the Kochanes patriarchate was hereditary at this period, and Abraham Shimonaya was consecrated a bishop in 1883 and appointed natar kursya (guardian of the throne, i.e. designated successor).

In the first decade of the twentieth century the Chaldean Catholic Church made a determined effort to win over the clergy and laity of the Kochanes patriarchate to the Catholic faith. One of their chief sympathisers in the Kochanes patriarchate was Nimrod, the ambitious brother of the patriarch Shemʿon XVIII Rubil, who allowed his own village of Khananis to be used as a base for the Catholic missionary effort. The Catholic effort reached its peak on 31 March 1903, when Nimrod, Abraham Shimonaya, the bishop Ishoʿyahb of Berwari and a number of other influential figures were received into the Chaldean church in a well-publicised ceremony in Mosul. During this ceremony Abraham Shimonaya was consecrated bishop for a new Chaldean diocese of Hakkari. A reaction followed immediately. The patriarch Shemʿon XVIII Rubil had died two days earlier, on 29 March 1903, and his opponents, encouraged by missionaries of the Russian Orthodox Church and the Anglican Church, secured the succession of his 15-year-old nephew Shemʿon XIX Benjamin in place of the natar kursya Abraham Shimonaya, holding a snap election on 12 April during Abraham's absence in Mosul.

Abraham Shimonaya served as bishop of Hakkari from 1903 to 1915. In theory he was responsible for the growing number of Chaldean converts living among the villages of the Kochanes patriarchate, but in practice he was kept under close supervision by the Chaldean church, being deployed as an auxiliary bishop to Yaʿqob Manna, bishop of the recently established Chaldean diocese of Van. At the beginning of the First World War he left Van and returned to the Hakkari region, but fell ill and died in the church of Mar Abraham in the Upper Tiyari village of Chamba d'Malik in either July or August 1915.

== See also ==
- Assyrian Church of the East
- Chaldean Catholic Church
- Church of the East

== Sources ==
- James Farwell Coakley:The Church of the East and the Church of England.Clarendon Press, Oxford 1992nd 95. 130. 131f. 175. 181f.1 97th 259f. 262. 395 - ISBN 0-19-826744-4.
- Joseph Alichoran:Quand le Hakkari penchait pour le Catholicism.In: Proche-Orient Chrétien 41, 1 (1991) 34-55.
- Wilmshurst, David (2000). The Ecclesiastical Organisation of the Church of the East, 1318–1913. Louvain: Peeters Publishers. ISBN 978-90-429-0876-5.
