= Chaldean Catholic diocese of Amid =

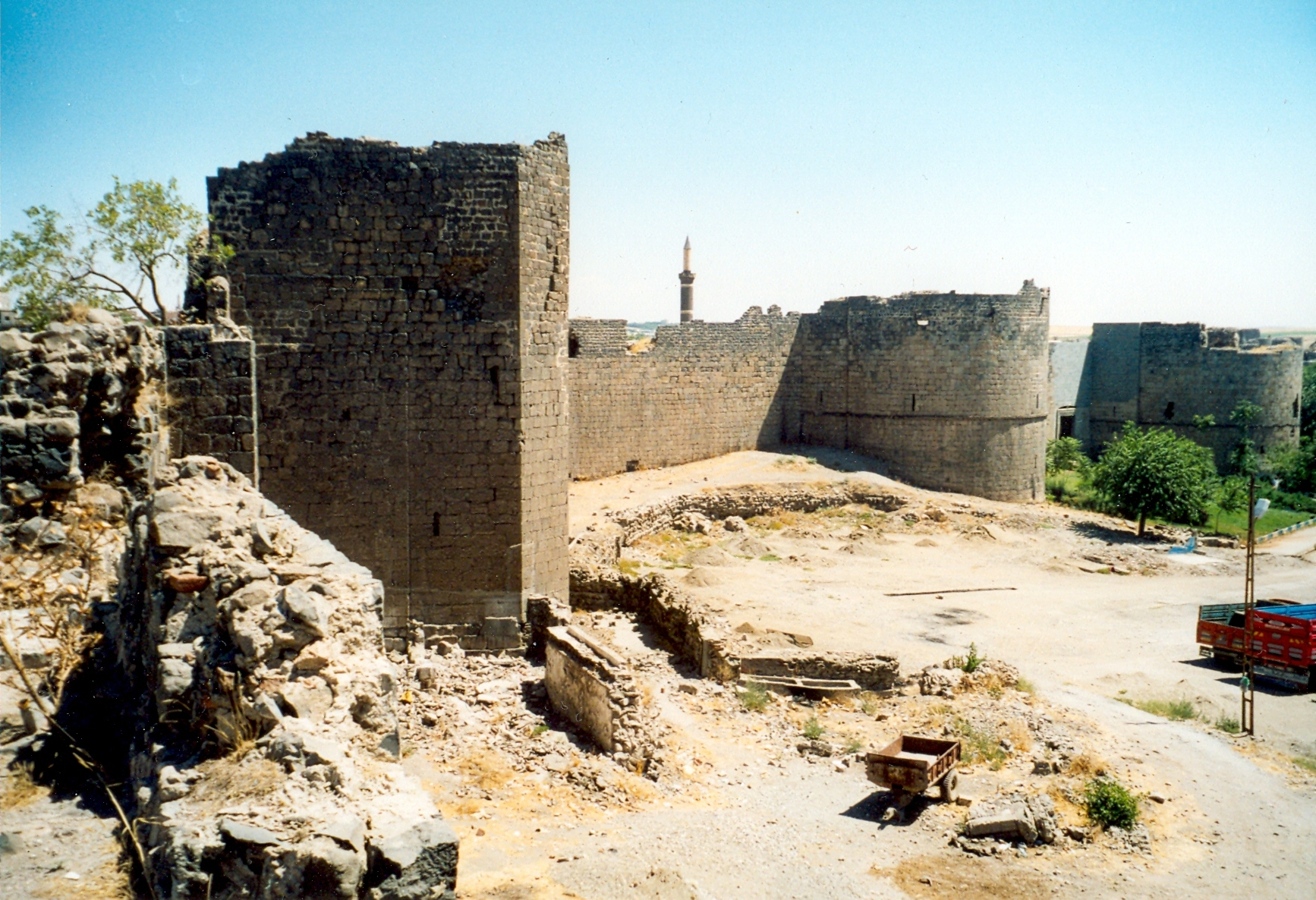
The black basalt Roman walls of Amid (Diyarbakir)

The Diocese of Amid (Diyarbakir) was a diocese or archdiocese of the Chaldean Church from the sixteenth to the twentieth century. From at least the 13th century the city of Amid had been part of the Diocese of Maiperqat of the Church of the East; following the schism of 1552 it became the seat of its own diocese in the Chaldean Church.

The archdiocese lapsed in 1929 on the death of the bishop Shlemun Mushe al-Sabbagh. The title of Amid was revived by the Chaldean church in 1966 as the Chaldean Catholic Archeparchy of Amida. The Archeparchy is now the sole remaining Chaldean diocese in Turkey, so in effect has jurisdiction over all of Turkeys Chaldeans. They maintain 2 churches in Diyarbakir and the bishop resides in Istanbul.

== Background ==
The East Syriac Diocese of Amid was a comparatively late foundation. The city of Amid (Diyarbakir) was predominantly an Armenian and Syriac Orthodox centre; there is little evidence for a presence of the Church of the East in the earlier period. Amid was part of the Church of the East Diocese of Maiperqat in 1257, when the bishop Yohannan 'of Maiperqat and Amid' was present at the consecration of the patriarch Makkikha II. Some years later the bishop Ishoʿdnah of 'Maiperqat, Amid and Mardin' was present at the consecrations of the patriarchs Denha I in 1265 and Yahballaha III in 1281. The diocese of Maiperqat is attested as early as 1018, and given the prominence of Maiperqat in the titles of these two bishops, Amid and Mardin were probably administered by the East Syriac bishops of Maiperqat in the thirteenth century.

A manuscript in the Berlin collection lists seven purported fourteenth- and fifteenth-century bishops of Amid: Marutha, Sliba-zkha, Gabriel, Shemʿon, Nathaniel, Israel and Shubhalmaran. As with a similar list of bishops of Mardin, it is difficult to accept this list as genuine. Towards the end of the fifteenth century Amid appears to have been under the authority of the metropolitan Eliya of Nisibis, who is mentioned in the dating formulas of a number of manuscripts copied between 1477 and 1483.

The colophon of a manuscript copied in Mardin in 1502 mentions a metropolitan named Eliya. He is possibly to be identified with the above-mentioned metropolitan Eliya of Nisibis but more probably with the metropolitan Eliya of Gazarta, mentioned in the colophon of a manuscript of 1504.

== Chaldean bishops of Amid ==
The Chaldean diocese of Amid seems to have been founded by Yohannan Sulaqa shortly after the schism of 1552 that divided the Church of the East into the Assyrian Church of the East and the Chaldean Church. The monk Hormizd Habib, of the Asmar family of Amid, was consecrated metropolitan of Amid by Sulaqa on 19 November 1553, taking the name Eliya. He was sent to India with Sulaqa's brother Joseph in 1555 by the second Chaldean patriarch ʿAbdishoʿ IV Maron, and appears to have returned to Mesopotamia early in 1561. Thereafter he is mentioned as metropolitan of Amid, associated with the patriarchs ʿAbdishoʿ IV and Eliya VI (1558-1591), in a series of manuscripts from 1562 to 1579. He was able to convert the patriarch Shemʿon IX Denha to Catholicism, was created procurator by a synod of East Syriac bishops in 1580, and was sent on a mission to Rome to seek his confirmation by the Vatican. He died in Lebanon in 1582, on his return from Rome.

An archbishop of Amid named Joseph Eliya is mentioned by Leonard Abel in 1583, and is also included in his list of the more lettered Nestorians in 1587.

The metropolitan Eliya Bar Tappe, dependent on the patriarch Eliya VII, is mentioned under a variety of titles in the dating formulas or colophons of several manuscripts between 1599 and 1618. He is listed in the reports of 1607 and 1610 as metropolitan of Amid, and a bishop Isho'yahb of Seert is separately listed. He was one of a number of bishops addressed by Peter Strozza in a letter of 1614. In 1616 he was present at the synod of Amid as metropolitan of Seert, but up to 1612 seems to have been responsible for the diocese of Amid as well.

In 1615, after his return from Rome, the archdeacon Rabban Adam was consecrated metropolitan of Amid. He took the name Timothy, after the disciple of the apostle Paul, in compliment to pope Paul V. He was present at the synod of Amid in 1616, and signed its acts as 'metropolitan of Jerusalem and Amid'. He signed the profession of faith of Eliya IX in 1617 as 'archbishop of Jerusalem'. He is mentioned in the dating formula of a manuscript of 1619, and is said to have died of plague in 1621 or 1622. The note recording his death styled him 'metropolitan of Amid, Nisibis, Mardin, Hesna and Jerusalem'.

After Timothy's death Ishoʿyahb, nephew of Eliya Bar Tappe and metropolitan of Seert since 1619, seems to have been responsible for Amid also until his death in 1628. A metropolitan named Joseph Ishoʿyahb, probably the same man, is mentioned together with the patriarch Eliya in the dating formula of a manuscript copied at Aleppo in 1626, suggesting that Aleppo was under the jurisdiction of the metropolitans of Amid at this period.

Thereafter the diocese of Amid seems to have been vacant for ten years until it was filled by the metropolitan Shemʿon, who was the scribe of manuscripts of 1637 and 1638 and is mentioned in the dating formulas of a number of manuscripts between 1651 and 1657. He is associated in these manuscripts with the Qochanes patriarch Shemʿon XI, a known supporter of the union with Rome, probably because of his Catholic sympathies.

A metropolitan of Amid named ʿAbdishoʿ was one of the signatories of a letter of 22 November 1669 from the patriarch Eliya X to pope Clement IX.

He was succeeded very soon afterwards by Joseph, the future Amid patriarch, who was also dependent on the Eliya line. In 1672, not long after his consecration, Joseph became a Catholic, and was recognised as an independent archbishop of Amid and Mardin by the Turkish authorities in the face of strenuous opposition from the Nestorian patriarch Eliya X. Not all Amid's East Syriac Christians followed him, however, and a group loyal to Eliya X put forward one of their number, a man named David, who was consecrated by the Nestorian patriarch in opposition to Joseph in 1673. David seems to have resided in Amid for only four years, and on Joseph's return from Rome in 1677 'fled to Egypt, where he has not been heard of since'.

Joseph I became patriarch of the Amid Chaldeans in 1681. His health began to deteriorate soon afterwards, and he chose as his successor the Catholic poet Sliba Maʿruf of Telkepe, whom he ordained as a priest in 1689, giving him the name Joseph, and metropolitan of Amid in 1691. He left Amid again in August 1694 for a second visit to Rome, where he remained until his death in 1707. In 1696 the metropolitan Joseph was recognised by the Vatican as the Amid patriarch Joseph II.

Timothy Maroge of Baghdad, the future Amid patriarch Joseph III, was consecrated metropolitan of Amid by Joseph II c.1705. He had been a metropolitan for three years and was ministering to the Chaldeans of Mardin when he was recalled to Amid on the outbreak of the plague of 1708. According to the narrative of the Syrian Catholic priest Eliya ibn al-Qsir, he was the only Chaldean bishop to have survived the plague. He was elected patriarch in 1713, a few months after the death of Joseph II in 1712.

Between 1717 and 1728 the metropolitan of Amid was ʿAbd al-Ahad, son of Garabet, of ʿAïn Tannur, author of a Life of Joseph I, who took the name Basil. He was consecrated by Timothy III in the village of ʿAïn Tannur on Sunday, 5 November 1717. He died on 3 January 1728. His Catholic profession of faith is given by Assemani.

He was succeeded by Timothy Masaji, who was consecrated by Joseph III, and seems to have been metropolitan of Amid for nearly thirty years. According to one source, he died on 31 December 1756, but Tfinkdji states that he died on 1 January 1757, 'poisoned by the heretics, it is said'.

According to Cardinal Tamburini, Joseph III consecrated a 23- or 25-year-old priest named Antony Gallo as his coadjutor on 20 November 1754, with the intention that he would eventually succeed him as Amid patriarch. Following protests by the Catholics of Amid his election as coadjutor was disallowed by the Vatican, and he died shortly afterwards, on 11 January 1757. Tisserant has suggested that Antony was also metropolitan of Amid from 1754 onwards, but it seems more likely that Timothy Masaji remained metropolitan of Amid until his death.

Timothy Masaji was succeeded in 1757 by Laʿzar Hindi, who had been educated at the Propaganda. Laʿzar Hindi, who also took the name Timothy, was consecrated on 8 February 1757 by Basil, bishop of Mardin, shortly after the death of Joseph III in January 1757. He succeeded Joseph III as the fourth Amid patriarch shortly afterwards, and his transfer from the see of Amid and appointment as patriarch was confirmed by the Vatican on 25 March 1759.

He was succeeded by Yohannan al-Akkari (1760–77), who is mentioned in the dating formula of a manuscript of 1766/7, and then by Augustine Hindi (1777–1804).

Basil Asmar of Telkepe, a monk of the monastery of Rabban Hormizd and metropolitan of ʿAmadiya since 1824, fled to Amid in 1827 after being expelled from Telkepe by Yohannan Hormizd, and was consecrated metropolitan of Amid after the death of Augustine Hindi. On his death in 1842 he was succeeded by Giwargis Peter di Natale, the coadjutor of the patriarch Yohannan VIII Hormizd, who died in 1867.

Peter Timothy ʿAttar was metropolitan of Amid from 1870 to 1873. He was succeeded in 1874 by ʿAbdishoʿ Giwargis Khayyat, previously metropolitan of ʿAmadiya, who became patriarch in 1894.

The last Chaldean bishop of Amid was Shlemun Mushe al-Sabbagh, who succeeded Giwargis ʿAbdishoʿ Khayyat in 1897. He left his diocese in 1915, during the massacres of Christians in the region. According to his epitaph in the Chaldean church of Mar Pethion in Amid, in which his name is given as Shlemun Bar Srʿa, he was born in Mosul in April 1865, became a priest in April 1888, was consecrated metropolitan of Amid and Maiperqat in September 1897, and died in June 1929.

The title of Amid, often now known as the Archeparchy of Diyarbakir, was revived by the Chaldean church in 1966 for the sole remaining Chaldean diocese in Turkey, whose bishop resided in Istanbul.

== Population statistics ==
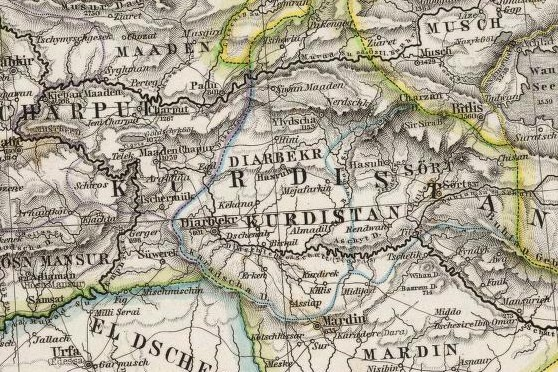
Amid (Diyarbakr) and its environs

A number of statistics are available for the Chaldean diocese of Amid. In 1757 it contained 3 churches and 5,000 believers (Hindi). In 1818 only three Jacobite villages, two Armenian villages, and the Chaldean village of Sharukhiya remained in the immediate vicinity of the city of Amid (Campanile).

In 1850 the diocese consisted of Amid itself and the villages of Sharukhiya and 'Ali Pasha' (ʿAïn Tannur), with two churches, four priests, and 150 Chaldean families (Badger). In 1867 it had 2 villages, 6 priests and 2,000 believers (Martin).

In 1896 the diocese of Amid had 3,000 Chaldeans, with parishes for Sharukhiya and Maiperqat, and stations in the villages of Boshat and Bakos (Chabot). The diocese had 3 churches, with a chapel at ʿAïn Tannur.

The diocese of Amid contained 9 villages, 12 priests and 4,180 believers in 1913 (Tfinkdji). By then it also included the villages of 'Navdacht', Zere and Atshe (Hattakh near Maiperqat), which lay in the plain between the Tigris and Sasun rivers, and had been recently converted from the Assyrian Church of the East.

Chaldean communities in the archdiocese of Amid, 1913

Name of Village	Name in Syriac	Number of Believers	Number of Priests	Number of Churches	Name of Village	Name in Syriac	Number of Believers	Number of Priests	Number of Churches
Amid	ܐܡܝܕ	2,500	6	1	Navdasht		100	0	0
Maiperqat	ܡܝܦܪܩܝܛ	500	1	1	Zere		120	1	0
Sharukhiya		150	1	1	Hattah		30	0	0
'Ain Tannur		80	0	1	Urfa	ܐܘܪܗܝ	200	2	1
Boshat		500	1	0	Total		4,180	12	5
