= Akre (diocese) =

Former Eastern Catholic diocese in Iraq

Aqra, properly ʿAqra, was a diocese of the Chaldean Catholic Church founded in the mid-19th century. It was united with the Archeparchy of Mossul to create the Archeparchy of Mossul-Aqra on December 22, 2018.

== Background ==
Before the fourteenth century the ʿAqra or Aqrah region was part of the diocese of Marga, one of the suffragan dioceses in the metropolitan province of Adiabene. This diocese, frequently mentioned in Thomas of Marga's Book of Governors, included the districts of Sapsapa (the Navkur plain south of ʿAqra, on the east bank of the Khazir river), Talana and Nahla d'Malka (two valleys around the upper course of the Khazir river), Beth Rustaqa (the Gomel valley) and probably also several villages in the Zibar district. The diocese is first mentioned in the eighth century (the region was probably in the diocese of Beth Nuhadra previously), and several of its bishops are mentioned between the eighth century and the first half of the thirteenth century. By the second half of the thirteenth century the names of two villages in the Gomel valley, Tella and Barbelli (Billan), were also included in the title of the diocese. Two bishops of Tella and Barbelli are known from the second half of the thirteenth century and a third, Ishoʿyahb, was present at the synod of Timothy II in 1318. The diocese is not mentioned thereafter, and no other bishops are known from the ʿAqra region until the nineteenth century.

== The Chaldean diocese of Aqra ==
As far as is known, neither the Mosul nor the Qudshanis patriarchate had a bishop for the ʿAqra region until the nineteenth century. The colophons of the surviving manuscripts from the ʿAqra region invariably mention the Mosul patriarchs of the Eliya line, and there is no evidence that the Qudshanis patriarchs took any interest in the region before the 1830s. Most of the villages in the ʿAqra region were still traditionalist at the beginning of the nineteenth century (though the Zibar villages of Arena and Barzane had Catholic communities before the end of the eighteenth century), and determined efforts by the Chaldean church to convert them to Catholicism in the 1830s shook their traditional loyalty, enabling the Qudshanis patriarchate to exercise some influence in the region for a short period.

The ʿAqra region had a number of Catholic communities by the end of the eighteenth century, which were included in the Chaldean diocese of ʿAmadiya. Two unsuccessful attempts were made by the patriarch Yohannan VIII Hormizd to give the region its own Chaldean bishop in the 1830s. In 1834, in an attempt to preserve the patriarchal succession in his own family, he sent his nephew Eliya Sefaro to Urmi, where he was consecrated bishop of ʿAqra by the Qudshanis patriarch Shemʿon XVII Abraham. Shortly afterwards Eliya made a Catholic profession of faith and 'was received into the bosom of the Chaldean church'. His consecration was not recognised by the Vatican, and he was suspended. In 1835 he was absolved and sent to Tel Isqof as a priest. The incident was notorious, and Badger's contemporary account is to be preferred to an alternative tradition preserved by Tfinkdji, who stated that Eliya was consecrated at Qudshanis in 1829, and that the patriarch's motive was to harass his old enemy, the metropolitan of ʿAmadiya Joseph Audo.

Soon afterwards Yohnnan VIII Hormizd consecrated a metropolitan named Abraham for the ʿAqra region, who went over to the Qudshanis patriarch Shemʿon XVII Abraham in 1847. In 1850 he was residing in the monastery of Mar ʿAbdishoʿ near Nerem, and was in charge of a diocese of fifteen villages in the ʿAqra region. He is not mentioned again, and as ʿAqra was not included in the dioceses of the Qudshanis patriarchate in 1877 by Cutts, it seems likely that the region had by then returned to its traditional allegiance. In 1852 Eliya Sefaro was again consecrated for ʿAqra, by the patriarch Joseph VI Audo, and a stable Chaldean diocese in the region was finally established. According to a contemporary note in a manuscript from the ʿAqra region, Eliya Sefaro died in Herpa two years after his consecration, on 22 September 1854, and was buried in the village. This date is probably to be preferred to Tfkinkdji's statement (followed by Fiey) that he died in 1863.

Eliya Sefaro was succeeded by Yohannan Eliya Mellus, who was consecrated on 5 June 1864 by Joseph VI Audo. In 1874 Mellus was sent to India during the Malabar schism, and did not return to Kurdistan until 1882. He remained nominally bishop of ʿAqra during this period, but was under suspension until 1889, and for several years after his return lived in Mosul. In 1889 he made his submission to pope Leo XIII, and in 1890 was transferred to the diocese of Mardin by the patriarch Eliya XII ʿAbulyonan. He was succeeded as bishop of ʿAqra by Yaʿqob Yohannan Sahhar, patriarchal vicar of Basra since 1887, who was consecrated for ʿAqra on 25 March 1893.

At the synod of Alqosh in 1894 the newly elected patriarch ʿAbdishoʿ V Khayyat asked to retain Eliya Joseph Khayyat, bishop-designate of ʿAmadiya, as his patriarchal vicar, and the dioceses of ʿAmadiya and ʿAqra were temporarily united under Yaʿqob Yohannan Sahhar, who was responsible for the united diocese from 23 April 1895 until his death in 1909.

In 1910 the two dioceses were again divided, and between 1910 and 1945 the diocese of ʿAqra was administered by a patriarchal vicar. In 1945 the future patriarch Paul Cheiko was appointed bishop of ʿAqra. In 1957 he was replaced by Andrew Sana, who was promoted to Archbishop of Kirkuk in 1977. In 1980 Abdelahad Rabban was appointed bishop of Aqra.

ʿAbdalahad Rabban died on 25 July 1998. The diocese of ʿAqra has remained vacant since his death, and the few remaining Chaldeans in the ʿAqra district are now under the care of an apostolic administrator, Father Youhanna Issa.

== Population statistics ==
In 1850 the traditionalist diocese of ʿAqra included eleven villages in the ʿAqra region and four villages in the Gomel valley, and contained 249 families, 9 priests and 13 churches (Badger). The large villages of Khardes and Herpa and several smaller villages were not included in Badger's list, probably because the majority of their inhabitants were Catholics.

The Chaldean diocese of ʿAqra had a population of 2,718 Chaldeans, with 17 priests, in 1867 (Martin); 1,000 Chaldeans, with 8 priests and 12 churches, in 1896 (Chabot); and 2,390 Chaldeans, with 16 priests and 10 churches, in 1913 (Tfinkdji). All of the villages listed in the traditionalist diocese in 1850 (apart from the Zibar villages of Erdil and Beth Kola) had Catholic communities in 1913, but the process of conversion was far from complete. Eleven villages in the diocese of ʿAqra in 1896, and the last nine villages listed by Tfinkdji in 1913, were 'semi-Nestorian'. A recently published book by Youel Baaba has supplied the Syriac names of the villages in the diocese of ʿAqra.

Chaldean communities in the diocese of ʿAqra, 1913

Name of Village	Name in Syriac	Number of Believers	Number of Priests	Number of Churches	Name of Village	Name in Syriac	Number of Believers	Number of Priests	Number of Churches
ʿAqra		250	2	1	Dooreh	ܕܘܪܐ	50	1	1
Herpa		200	1	1	Artun		100	1	1
Khardes		120	1	0	Beth Mishmish		150	0	1
Nerem		100	1	1	Beth Nura		80	0	0
Sharmen	ܫܪܡܢ	250	1	1	Gwessa		60	0	0
Shahwipalan		120	1	0	Guppa		40	0	0
Gorgoran		80	1	0	Barzane		90	1	0
Nuhawa	ܢܘܗܒܐ	150	1	1	Beth Sapre		30	0	0
Arena		300	2	1	Mallabarwan		120	1	1
Sanaya		100	1	1	Total		2,390	16	10
