= Emmanuel Yosip =

Iraqi-Canadian bishop

His Grace Dr. Mar Emmanuel Yosip
- Bishop of Canada
- Church: Assyrian Church of the East ܥܕܬܐ ܕܡܕܢܚܐ ܕܐܬܘܖ̈ܝܐ
- Diocese: Canada
- Installed: 3 June 1990

Orders
- Ordination: 3 June 1990 by Mar Dinkha IV
- Rank: Bishop

Personal details
- Born: Emmanuel Rehana Yosip; 1958 (age 67–68) Baghdad, Iraq
- Denomination: Assyrian Church of the East
- Residence: Toronto, Canada
- Occupation: Cleric
- Education: PhD in Syriac Studies, Master's Degree in Near and Middle Eastern Civilizations
- Alma mater: University of Toronto

Mar Emmanuel Yosip (Classical Syriac: ܡܪܝ ܥܡܐܢܘܝܠ ܝܘܣܦ; born Emmanuel Rehana Yosip) is a Christian Bishop of the Assyrian Church of the East (Classical Syriac: ܥܕܬܐ ܕܡܕܢܚܐ ܕܐܬܘܖ̈ܝܐ), presiding over the Diocese of Canada.

== Early life ==
Emmanuel Rehana Yosip was born in 1958 in Iraq to a devout Christian family. He subsequently moved to the United States where he was ordained a deacon in 1981, and a priest in 1984 at Mar Gewargis Cathedral (St. George Cathedral) in Chicago, Illinois.

== Education ==
Mar Emmanuel obtained his PhD in Syriac studies from the University of Toronto in 2015. His doctoral dissertation is titled The Book of Resh Melle by Yohannan Bar Penkaye: An Introduction to the Text and Study of its Literary Genres. He also holds a master's degree in Near and Middle Eastern civilizations from the same university, as well as a Master of Divinity.

== Tenure as Bishop ==
On 3 June 1990, Emmanuel Rehana Yosip was consecrated as Bishop of Canada by Mar Dinkha IV, taking the name Mar Emmanuel Yosip.

=== Advocacy ===
As Bishop, Mar Emmanuel has been an activist in the awareness of the plight of the persecuted Christians of the Middle East. On 9 December 2014, he spoke with The Standing Committee on Foreign Affairs and International Development in a meeting on "Canada's Response to the Violence, Religious Persecution and Dislocation Caused by the Islamic State of Iraq and the Levant (ISIL)".

== Diocese of Canada ==
=== Parishes ===
- Mart Mariam (St. Mary) Cathedral - Toronto, Ontario
- Mar Mari (St. Mari) Parish - Hamilton, Ontario
- Mar Toma (St. Thomas) Parish - Windsor, Ontario
- Mar Zaia (St. Zayya) Parish - London, Ontario
- St. George (Mar Giwargis) Parish - Calgary, Alberta

== See also ==
- Assyrian Church of the East
