= Odisho Oraham =

His Grace Mar Odisho Oraham
- Bishop of Scandinavia and Germany
- Church: Assyrian Church of the East ܥܕܬܐ ܕܡܕܢܚܐ ܕܐܬܘܖ̈ܝܐ
- Diocese: Scandinavia and Germany

Orders
- Consecration: July 24, 1994 by Mar Dinkha IV
- Rank: Bishop

Personal details
- Born: July 12, 1961 (age 64)
- Denomination: Assyrian Church of the East
- Residence: Sweden
- Occupation: Cleric

Mar Odisho Oraham (born July 12, 1961) is the Assyrian Church of the East Bishop of Scandinavia and Germany with residence in Sweden.
