= Chaldean Catholic Eparchy of Salmas =

Eparchy of Salmas Eparchia Salmasiensis

Location
- Country: Iran
- Metropolitan: Archeparchy of Urmiā
- Headquarters: Urmia, West Azerbaijan province, Iran

Information
- Denomination: Chaldean Catholic Church
- Sui iuris church: Chaldean Catholic Church
- Rite: East Syriac Rite
- Established: 1709; 317 years ago

Current leadership
- Pope: Leo XIV
- Patriarch: Paul III Nona
- Eparch: Sede vacante Patriarchal Administrator: Imad Khoshaba Gargees

For much of the nineteenth and twentieth centuries the district of Salmas in northwest Iran was an archdiocese of the Chaldean Catholic Church, now a part of the Chaldean Catholic Archeparchy of Urmyā.

== Early history ==
In the East Syriac tradition the martyrdom of the apostle Bartholemew has traditionally been placed at Salmas. Although there were East Syriac Christians in the Salmas district at least as early as the seventh century, Salmas is not heard of as the seat of an East Syriac bishop until 1281, when its bishop Joseph attended the enthronement of Mar Yaballaha III.

The church of the village of Chara in the Salmas district was built in 1360 at the expense of Mar Sliba, probably the bishop of Salmas. The name Sliba was taken at a later period by the bishops of Jilu, a district with which Salmas was linked in the sixteenth century.

The Salmas district was inhabited by both Nestorian and Armenian Christians, and around the end of the thirteenth century had both a Nestorian and an Armenian bishop. During the fifteenth century a number of Latin bishops were appointed for Salmas, though they may have been titular bishops only. Only the Nestorian bishopric seems to have survived into the sixteenth century.

== Catholic and Nestorian rivalry in the Salmas district ==
An unnamed bishop of Salmas was one of only three remaining Nestorian bishops in 1551. Salmas is listed by ʿAbdishoʿ IV Maron in 1562 as a metropolitan see, with suffragans at 'Baumar' (apparently a village in the Salmas plain), 'Sciabathan' (possibly Shapat, the Shemsdin district) and 'Vastham' (possibly Vastan on the shore of Lake Van). ʿAbdishoʿ's letter stated that these and other bishoprics were in Persian territory.

The patriarch Shemʿon IX Denha was earlier metropolitan of 'Salmas, Seert and Jilu'. It is surprising to find these widely separated districts linked, but there is no reason to doubt that the title has been correctly given. It is possible that the metropolitan was responsible for a refugee community from Jilu, apparently living in Persia, rather than for the district of Jilu itself.

A metropolitan of Salmas named Joseph was one of the signatories of a letter of 1580 from Shemʿon IX Denha to pope Gregory XIII, and was presumably consecrated by his predecessor shortly after he became patriarch. A metropolitan Joseph of Salmas is also mentioned in the report of 1607.

The bishop ʿAbdishoʿ ('Servijesus') of Salmas ('Salmi') is listed among the hierarchy of Eliya VII (1591-1617) in the report of 1610, together with a bishop Ishoʿyahb 'of the land of Persia', dependent on the patriarch Shemʿon X.

Ishoʿyahb, 'archbishop of Persia', was one of the bishops addressed in a letter of Peter Strozza of 1614, and may have been a bishop of Salmas, as the name later became traditional.

A Catholic bishop named Abraham, styled episcopus Vehdonfores ('bishop of the jurisdiction of Persia'), possibly bishop of Salmas, was present at the synod of Amid in 1615.

The Salmas district came under strong Chaldean influence at the end of the sixteenth and the first half of the seventeenth century, when Salmas was the seat of the patriarchs Shemʿon IX Denha (1580–1600) and Shemʿon X (1600–38). According to Fiey, Shemʿon XI (1638–56), Shemʿon XII (1656–62) and Shemʿon XIII Denha (1662–1700) also spent most of their time at Salmas.

It is difficult to determine the episcopal succession in the diocese of Salmas in the late-seventeenth and eighteenth centuries. According to Tfindkji Salmas returned to Nestorianism between 1640 and 1710, and the Catholic metropolitans of Salmas between 1709 and 1833 were Ishoʿyahb (1709–52), Ishoʿyahb Shemʿon (1777–93) and Ishoʿyahb Yohannan Gabriel (1795–1833). Fiey accepted the dates for the first of these metropolitans, added another metropolitan before Ishoʿyahb Shemʿon, also named Ishoʿyahb, who died in 1777, and correctly gave the date of Ishoʿyahb Shemʿon's death as 1789. A number of references in manuscript colophons and other sources enable Fiey's account to be supplemented.

A metropolitan of Salmas named Ishoʿyahb, from Khosrowa, is mentioned together with the patriarch Shemʿon XIII Denha (1662–1700) in the dating formulas of manuscripts of 1667, 1678 and 1686. As Shemʿon XIII politely rebuffed an approach from the Vatican in 1670, it is likely that Ishoʿyahb was a Nestorian bishop, and should be distinguished from a Catholic bishop of the same name attested in 1709.

According to Tfinkdji 'the Nestorians of Persia' wrote to the Amid patriarch Joseph II in 1709 to assure him of their adherence to the Catholic faith and their dependence on the leadership of Mar Ishoʿyahb, a Catholic bishop of Salmas. This Mar Ishoʿyahb appears to have been given the reign-dates 1709–52 by Tfinkdji and Fiey because a metropolitan of the same name fled 'on account of the destruction of his diocese by Oz Beg' to the village of Seduh near Seert in 1751, 'where he long remained'. Ishoʿyahb's flight to the Chaldean village of Seduh strongly suggests that he was a Catholic bishop dependent on Joseph III, and it is therefore probable that the two men should be identified.

A 'metropolitan of Salamast' named ʿAbdishoʿ, mentioned neither by Tfinkdji nor Fiey, was the scribe of a manuscript of 1716, and in 1734 Khidr of Mosul referred to an unnamed metropolitan of Salmas and also to a bishop ʿAbdishoʿ of an unnamed see in the Urmi district, possibly Salmas. If the Catholic bishop Ishoʿyahb was metropolitan of Salmas between 1709 and 1751, ʿAbdishoʿ was presumably a Nestorian bishop dependent on the patriarch Shemʿon XIV Shlemun (1700–40).

Catholicism was brought to Khosrowa in the eighteenth century, according to an account quoted by Hornus, by a youth named Ephrem from Amid, who was later ordained a priest, and whose autobiography was preserved in the cathedral at Khosrowa until it was destroyed in the First World War. The decisive shift to Catholicism seems to have been made in the last quarter of the eighteenth century, thanks to the efforts of the metropolitan Ishoʿyahb Shemʿon (1777–89), who entered into communion with the Catholic Joseph line at Amid, bringing with him the majority of the East Syriacs of the region. During his reign he resided at Khosrowa. According to his tombstone in the cemetery of Khosrowa, he died on 10 April 1789 and his father's name was Giwargis. His epitaph stated that he 'preached and spread the faith of the church of Rome in the country of the Persians of Adarbaigan'.

== Bishops of the Chaldean archdiocese of Salmas ==
Ishoʿyahb Shemʿon was succeeded as metropolitan of Salmas in 1795 by Ishoʿyahb Ishaʿya Yohannan Gabriel (or John Guriel), who was consecrated a bishop at Baghdad on 8 November 1795 by Yohannan Hormizd. His appointment was resisted by a party in the Salmas district, who wanted as their bishop the priest Isaac, a nephew of the late metropolitan Ishoʿyahb Shemʿon. They sent Isaac to the Nestorian patriarch Shemʿon XVI Yohannan, who consecrated him bishop of Salmas at Qudshanis, giving him the name Ishoʿyahb Melchisedec. Eventually, following an approach by Yohannan Hormizd to the Persian authorities, Ishoʿyahb Gabriel was able to assert his authority and administer his diocese without opposition. Yohannan Guriel died on 15 July 1833 (or on 13 July 1832 according to other sources). During the last years of his reign the Chaldean bishop Peter Shawriz, ordained for Seert in 1801, resided in the Salmas district, where he died in 1831.

Gabriel's successor was his old rival Ishoʿyahb Melchisedec. Possibly because of the affection in which he had been held by many of the Chaldeans of Salmas, the Chaldean authorities felt it worthwhile to win him over, and he was consecrated metropolitan of Salmas by Yohannan Hormizd in 1833, remaining in office until his death on 23 August 1859. According to the epitaph on his tombstone in the cemetery of Khosrowa, he was the son of Ishoʿyahb Shemʿon's brother the priest Isaac, who died in 1800, and was styled 'metropolitan of Salmas and administrator of Adarbaigan'.

Possibly because of his previous association with the Nestorian patriarch, but principally because he was already elderly, Melchisedec was given assistance in his episcopal duties. The future patriarch Nicholas Zayʿa, an outstanding pupil of the college of the Propaganda, was consecrated bishop of 'Adarbaigan' and coadjutor bishop with the right of succession in 1836 by Yohannan Hormizd. In practice he ran the affairs of the diocese. Shiel met him in Dilman in 1836, and mentioned that he had studied at the College of the Propaganda for fifteen years.

After Nicholas Zayʿa became patriarch in 1839, Melchisedec seems to have been left temporarily without supervision, but a second coadjutor, Giwargis Augustine Barshina, was consecrated for the diocese in 1848. He was born in Khosrowa in 1814 and educated at the college of the Propaganda, and was ordained a priest in Rome in 1841, taking the name Giwargis. He was consecrated for Salmas on 11 July 1848 by the patriarch Joseph VI Audo, taking the name Augustine. After Melchisedec's death in 1859 he succeeded him as metropolitan of Salmas, remaining in office until his death in 1889.

He was succeeded in 1894 by Isaac Yahballaha Khudabakhash, who was born on 18 October 1859 in Khosrowa, educated at the college of the Propaganda, and ordained a priest on 28 February 1887. While a priest he attracted attention during the 'Salmas dispute' of 1894 over the ownership of a number of churches in the district, which embroiled the Nestorian and Chaldean churches, the Catholic, Anglican and American missionaries, and the consular representatives of France and Britain. He attended the synod of Alqosh in October 1894 as bishop-designate of Salmas, and was consecrated together with Joseph Eliya Khayyat, bishop-designate of ʿAmadiya, by Yohannan Eliya Mellus on 11 November 1894. After at least one other brush with the law he resigned in 1908 and retired to Cairo, where he subsequently became patriarchal vicar of its Chaldean community.

Isaac was succeeded in 1910 by Peter ʿAziz, who was born in Mosul on 6 April 1866, educated at the college of the Propaganda, and ordained a priest in 1890. Between 1894 and 1897 he was director of the patriarchal seminary at Mosul, and between 1897 and 1910 chorepiscopus and patriarchal vicar for the Chaldean community of Aleppo. He was chosen for Salmas on 25 January 1910, and consecrated at Mosul by the patriarch Emmanuel II Thomas on 15 August 1910. In 1918 he assisted at the funeral of the murdered Nestorian patriarch Shemʿon XIX Benjamin. He was transferred to the diocese of Zakho in 1928.

After his departure the Chaldean diocese of Urmi, vacant since the end of the First World War, became a metropolitan see, and was united with the see of Salmas in 1930. The first metropolitan of the new see was Isaac Yahballaha Khudabakhash, back from Cairo, who died in 1940. His successors were Abel Zayʿa (1940–51), Zayʿa Dashto (1951–72), Samuel Shawriz (1974–83) and Thomas Meram (from 1983).

== Topographical survey ==
The Salmas district, at least as early as the thirteenth century, was inhabited by both Armenian and East Syriac Christians, with the Armenians preponderating. A large number of Armenians emigrated in 1828, and by the middle of the nineteenth century the community was losing its former dominance. The village of Gulizan, for example, was originally an Armenian village, but was deserted early in the nineteenth century and by 1855 had been taken over by Chaldean Christians, who used its old Armenian church (Challaye). On the eve of the First World War the two communities were roughly the same size. In 1913 the East Syriac Christians of the Salmas district, mostly Chaldeans, numbered just over 10,000 and lived in 12 villages; in 1908 there were about 10,000 Armenians, living in 23 villages. The main Armenian village in the district was Haftwan (ܗܦܬܘܘܢ), which also had a Chaldean community.

The Chaldean archdiocese of Salmas had a population of 150 families in 1850 (Badger); 2,000 Chaldeans in 1854 (Challaye); 8,000 Chaldeans in 1867 (Martin); 10,000 Chaldeans in 1896 (Chabot); and 10,460 Chaldeans, with 24 priests and 12 churches, in 1913 (Tfinkdji). Although Ula is listed as a Chaldean village in 1913, at a slightly earlier period most of its villagers were loyal to the Qudshanis patriarchs (it was included in the Qudshanis diocese of Anzel), and as an isolated traditionalist bastion in the Salmas district in the nineteenth century was known as 'the faithful village' by East Syriac sympathisers in the Urmi region. Because of its geographical proximity the Chaldean diocese of Salmas also included the village of Gawilan, in the extreme north of the Anzel district, which had a significant Catholic community.

Chaldean Communities in the archdiocese of Salmas, 1913

Name of Village	Name in Syriac	Number of Believers	Number of Priests	Number of Churches
Salmas	ܣܠܡܣ	500	3	2
Khosrowa	ܟܘܣܪܒܐܕ	3,700	7	3
Patavur	ܦܬܒܘܪ	2,800	4	2
Gawilan	ܓܘܝܠܢ	1,000	3	1
Ula	ܐܘܠܐ	400	2	1
Gulizan	ܓܘܠܝܙܐܢ	300	0	1

Name of Village	Name in Syriac	Number of Believers	Number of Priests	Number of Churches
Khanaga	ܚܢܓܐ	270	0	0
Zewajik	ܙܝܘܓܘܩ	280	1	0
Satura	ܣܬܘܪܐ	240	1	0
Sarna	ܣܪܢܐ	490	2	1
Kuilavar		230	0	0
Chara	ܫܗܪܐ	250	1	1
Total		10,460	24	12

Youel Baaba, in a recently published bilingual book, mentions several other villages in the Salmas district with East Syriac populations: Balarur, Karilan, Kolamar, Kohnashahr, Koysan and Malham. Baaba's 'Kolamar' is perhaps to be identified with Tfinkdji's 'Kuilavar'.

The map The Assyrians of Iran, produced by the Assyrian community in the United States and presumably based on community memory, also lists the villages of Agha Isma'il, Ahrawan, Akhtakhana, Kalashan, Painjuko, Sawra and Yurashanlui. Some of these villages are not mentioned in any other source.
