= Chubanluy =

Chubanluy (Persian: چوبانلوي), also known as Chupanlu, may refer to:

- Chubanluy-e Olya, a village in Lakestan Rural District, Iran
- Chubanluy-e Sofla, a village in Lakestan Rural District, Iran
- Chabinlu, a village in Sarajuy-ye Sharqi Rural District, Iran
- Chobanlu, an abandoned village in the Syunik Province of Armenia
