= Azerbaijani–Kurdish conflict =

Ethnic violence and tensions in Iranian Azerbaijan

Azerbaijani-Kurdish conflict
- Bodies of Azerbaijanis following the 1979 Naqadeh clashes, also known as Sulduz massacre
Location	Iran, Azerbaijan
Status	Ongoing

Belligerents
Iranian Kurds	Iranian Azerbaijanis

Casualties and losses
- 7,600-10,500+ killed in total^{[a]}

The Azerbaijani-Kurdish conflict, also called the Azeri-Kurdish conflict in Iran refers to the ethnic violence and tensions between the Kurdish and Azerbaijani populations of West Azerbaijan, a multi-ethnic region. Stemming from a history of wars, revolts and the religious differences between the predominantly Sunni Kurds and Shia Azeris have also influenced relations between the two communities. Rising ethno-nationalism among both Kurds and Azerbaijanis may have intensified rivalry.

== Background ==
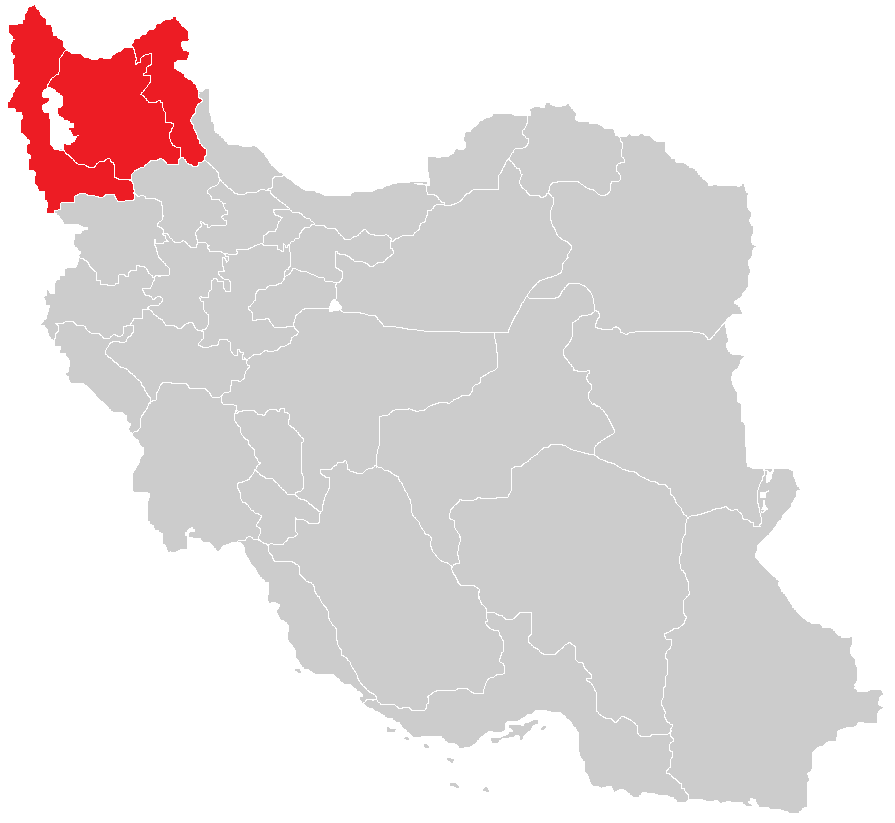
Three provinces of Iranian Azerbaijan region

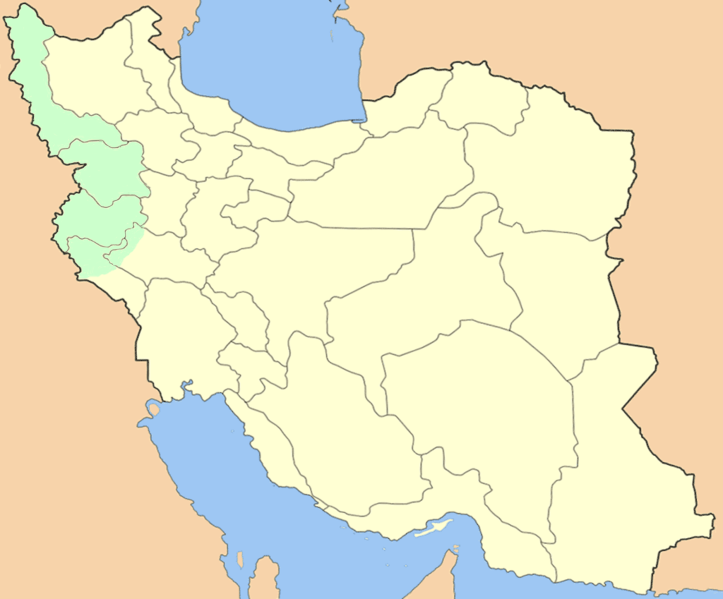
Map of Iranian Kurdistan.

The population of Iranian Azerbaijan is predominantly Azerbaijani Turkish-speaking, while Kurdish speakers are mainly concentrated in the western border districts. Historically, both Azerbaijani Turkish and Kurdish tribal groups inhabited the region, including the Afshar, Shahsevan, Shikak, Herki, Zarza, Mamash, Piran and Mangur. Tribal identities in the region were historically political as well as cultural, and groups sometimes changed their language and identity through migration, relocation and assimilation. Almost all Turkish-speaking Azerbaijanis are Shia Muslims, while Kurdish speakers are mainly Sunni. Some Turkish-speaking tribes had Kurdish origins, while certain originally Turkish groups in Sulduz gradually adopted Kurdish language and culture.

Historically, some Azeris viewed Kurds as "savage" and "blood thirsty", while Kurds used terms such as "Ajam" and "descendants of Mongols" to describe Azeris. Religious differences also contributed to hostility, with Shias referring to Sunnis as the "assassins of Imam Hussein".

In the modern day, ethno-nationalism among both Kurds and Azerbaijanis may have intensified rivalry.

== History ==
=== Soran Emirate ===
After the Soran Emirate defeated the Ottomans in the summer of 1834, Mir Muhammad, taking advantage of the respite, turned his attention to Iranian Kurdistan in October 1835 and conquered it “from end to end”, taking territory as far as the borders of southern Azerbaijan. During his conquests in parts of southern Azerbaijan, Kurdish battalions led by Muhammad Pasha raided and occupied the Azerbaijani region of Qotur, also crushing an Iranian force sent against them from Khoy, West Azerbaijan, and fortifying themselves in the occupied areas. At the same time, the Emir of Rawanduz led a large force and raided possessions around Salduz, plundering dozens of villages.

=== Sheikh Ubeydullah’s invasion of Azerbaijan ===
The first major effort to create something resembling an independent Kurdish state seemingly took place in 1880, under the leadership of Sheikh Ubeydullah, an influential sheykh in the districts south-east of Lake Van. He assembled an army from the numerous tribes under his authority and invaded Iranian Azerbaijan, where several local tribes joined his forces. The sheykh reportedly received quiet backing from Sultan Abdulhamid II, who supported the establishment of a Kurdish vassal state on former Iranian territory and apparently intended to use Ubeydullah against Armenian revolutionaries. The neighbouring town of Miandoab was inhabited by Shia Azeri Turks mostly. Following a Kurdish defeat, a commander ordered retaliation through a massacre of Miandoab’s inhabitants. The inhabitants attempted to resist but it failed. The massacre was followed by widespread pillaging in the surrounding areas of Maragha and Miandoab, further dispersing the rebel forces. Historical accounts give different estimates of the number of people killed. Captain Gerard, who visited the region a year after the rebellion, estimated the death toll at 2,000. Mrs. Cochran reported that more than 4,000 people had been killed and 150 villages sacked. Reverend Wilson, meanwhile, estimated that 3,000 people, including Shiites, Jews and Armenians, had been killed. Accounts also differ regarding the number of troops involved. Kurdish commander Hamza Agha reported to Sheikh ʿAbd al-Qadir that 4,000 troops had accompanied him and ʿAbd al-Qadir, while Reverend Wilson estimated their number at between 10,000 and 30,000. The Azeris later took revenge on the local sunni Kurds then.

=== World War 1 ===
In 1906, Ottoman troops invaded Iranian Azerbaijan and occupied a large part of its Kurdish-inhabited districts. They maintained a presence in the region, although their control was incomplete, until 1911, when Russian forces drove them out. Russia had invaded the province in 1909 and captured Tabriz, which, alongside Rasht, was then one of the last strongholds of Persia’s Constitutional Movement. Russian forces stationed infantry and Cossack units in Tabriz, Khoy, Dilman and Urmia. Until the outbreak of the First World War, these troops helped contain the Kurdish tribes without directly occupying their territories. However, in December 1914, following the launch of Enver Pasha’s Caucasian campaign, Russian troops were withdrawn. In early January 1915, Ottoman forces, supported by Kurdish irregular fighters, briefly occupied Azerbaijan. Russian forces returned around a year later until Russia its revolution and withdrew from the war completely. For a final short period in 1918, Turkish troops, supported by the Kurds, once again controlled parts of Azerbaijan.

=== Simko Shikak ===
After the end of the World War I, Simko Shikak, who was the head of the Shikak Kurdish tribe, began leading attacks on ethnic Assyrian and Azerbaijani civilians, as well as Iranian authorities, demanding independence for Kurdistan. On Friday, 19 December, Simko with nearly 4,000 Kurdish troops led an invasion into Lakestan, as they reached the vicinity of Soltan Ahmad. The Azerbaijanis resisted for two hours before being overwhelmed by the Kurds, who entered the city from all sides and began looting and killing. Civilians who escaped made it to Qara Qeshlaq, while some were killed before they reached it. In the telegram that survivors of Lakestan sent to Tabriz, they claimed that 3,500 Azerbaijanis had died, with 2,000 of them dying during the battles and 1,500 dying due to the cold weather while they were trying to escape. The deaths created a strong shock in Tabriz, where the people criticised the Iranian government. They compared the Lakestan incident to the Uprising of Sheikh Ubeydullah.

=== 1979-present ===
Following the Iranian revolution, Shia Azerbaijani recruits in the Islamic Revolutionary Guard Corps entered Egriqash and massacred the local Kurdish population. At the same time the Iranian government cracked down on dozens of Kurdish villages between 1979 and 1983, 60 villages were reportedly subjected to massacres or deadly operations, especially in the ethnically mixed Kurdish and Azeri areas around Naghadeh, but also in the regions of Piranshahr, Oshnavieh, Mahabad, and Bukan.

=== 1979 Naqadeh clashes ===
The Naqadeh clashes, known by Azerbaijanis as the Sulduz massacre, took place in April 1979, four days of intense fighting broke out between Kurdish and Azerbaijani groups in Naqadeh, Iran. Residents reported that Azerbaijani-speaking “Turks” had attacked a Kurdish village and burned its houses, apparently outnumbered, many Kurds to were forced into the surrounding hills. Azerbaijani combatants accused Kurdish fighters of slitting the throats of a number of children and using their blood to write slogans on walls, although no evidence was found to support these allegations. Azerbaijani’s were also witnessed dragging the body of a dead Kurdish man from a jeep and throwing it into the Gueddar River, where a crowd cheered and children threw stones at his body. The provincial deputy governor reported a casualty figure on both sides as 100 deaths and 150 injuries, although some residents claimed as many as 1,000 people had died. According to Azerbaijani sources more than 2,000 people were killed during the Kurdish attacks against Azerbaijanis. In an interview with the Pars News Agency, published on 16 Mehr 1358 (8 October 1979), Gholamreza Hassani, Khomeini’s representative in West Azerbaijan, gave his account of the incident. He claimed that the Kurdistan Democratic Party had organised an armed demonstration under the pretext of opening a party office in Naqadeh, frightening the local population. Hassani stated that, after 48 hours of armed resistance, religious scholars in the town appealed to him for assistance, and that he subsequently arrived with two troop-carrier vehicles and 400 fighters. He claimed that fighting lasted 16 hours before the Democratic Party forces withdrew, leaving dead and wounded, while several of his own fighters were also killed. Hassani further alleged that, following the clashes, the Kurdistan Democratic Party members killed 11 women and children in the home of a man named Badali, and thrust a metal skewer into the abdomen of a pregnant woman. The newspaper attributed the incidents to Abdul Rahman Ghassemlou, leader of the Kurdistan Democratic Party and Ezaddin Husseini, Secretary of the Komala Party. He also accused the party’s leadership of cooperating with the Fadaiyan-e Khalq. On 4 September 2021 Turkish politician, Ümit Özdağ posted on the Social media platform X regarding the incident; “Iranian Turkish sources are reporting that 300 PKK terrorists attacked the villages of South Azerbaijan Salmas, abducting the men and raping the women. In 1979, Iran-KDP massacred 2000 Turkish civilians. Videos related to the attack have begun circulating on social media.

=== 2021 Naqadeh incident ===
On 7 August, an Azerbaijani civilian in Naqadeh, West Azerbaijan province, killed a Kurdish man named Fardin Ebrahimi during a dispute. Following the incident the city experienced unrest that subsequently took on an ethnic/religious aspect after the incident. During the unrest, Mohammad Alizadeh, another Kurdish civilian, was shot dead by a man dressed in plain clothes, dozens were reportedly injured. Several Kurdish parties called on the people to calm down. And a group of Azerbaijani activists in Naqadeh issued two statements calling for peace.

=== 2022 Maku incident ===
In July 2022, clashes broke out between Kurdish and Azerbaijani smugglers in Maku, West Azerbaijan province. The violence escalated when a group of Azerbaijani Turks attacked a Kurdish nomadic encampment near Avajik, destroying and setting fire to the herders’ tents. A 43-year-old Kurdish man was killed, while Kurds later killed two Azerbaijani Turks in retaliation. More than 120 Kurdish nomadic families and their approximately 20,000 cattle were subsequently removed from the area by local authorities, who were ethnically Azerbaijani Turks, without compensation or an explanation. The Turkish newspaper Yeni Şafak reported a different account, claiming that the violence had begun with a PKK attack on ethnic Turks in Iran and accusing the Iranian government of cooperating with the group to remove Kurds from the area.

=== March 2025 Urmia incident ===
On 22 March 2025, anti-Kurdish slogans were reportedly chanted during a religious gathering commemorating the martyrdom of Imam Ali in Urmia, West Azerbaijan Province. A joint statement by Kurdish and Azerbaijani human rights organisations condemned the incident, reporting that some participants displayed anti-Kurdish banners, expressed nationalist sentiments and threatened Kurdish civilians. The statement also criticised the display of images of former Urmia Friday prayer leader Gholamreza Hassani, who was reportedly known for his anti-Kurdish rhetoric. On 24 March, the semi-official Tasnim news agency reported that 22 people had been arrested in connection with the incident, citing the provincial police commander, who accused them of inciting ethnic tensions and insulting ethnic groups.

=== October 2025 Urmia incident ===
On 13 October 2025 an official First Division football match in Urmia on 13 October 2025. Video footage showed supporters of Navad Urmia FC performing the wolf salute, a hand gesture associated with radical Turkish nationalist movements, and chanting slogans in Azeri glorifying the Gholamreza Hassani. The crowd repeatedly shouted “Hassani, where are you?”. Journalist Rasul Galeban pointed out, “Sports arenas, such as those for volleyball matches, have become platforms for hatred and for promoting Turkish-speaking candidates, creating atmospheres hostile to Kurds and Persians.” He added: “Sports in Urmia have long been politicized.”

== Notes ==
[a]. Azerbaijani-Kurdish conflict (combined death figure of major incidents until 1979; 7,600-10,500+):

Uprising of Sheikh Ubeydullah (October 1880) - 2,000-4,000 Azerbaijanis killed (including a number of Armenians and Jews)
Lakestan incident (December 1919) - 3,500 Azerbaijanis killed.
Naqadeh/Sulduz massacre - 100-1,000 Azerbaijani and Kurds killed in total. Over 2,000 Azerbaijanis killed (claimed)
