= Lakestan incident =

1920s invasion of Azerbaijan

- Part of Kurdish separatism in Iran, Simko Shikak revolt (1918–1922)
| Date | December 1919 |
| Location | Soltan Ahmad and Qarah Qeshlaq, Lakestan, West Azerbaijan province |
| Result | Iranian victory: Kurdish fighters initially capture Lakestan, later recaptured by Iranian forces; Continued ethnic tensions |

Belligerents
| (Simko Shikak) Kurdish forces | Azerbaijani locals Qajar Iran |

Commanders and leaders
| Simko Shikak | (Qajar Iran) Reza Khan (Qajar Iran) Masoud Divan † (Qajar Iran) Sadegh Khan (Qajar Iran) Taymour Yavur Habshi (Qajar Iran) Hajireza Qaraqeshlaghi (Qajar Iran) Karbalaei Ibrahim Khan (Qajar Iran) Qazaljah (Qajar Iran) Kazem Khan |

Strength
| Nearly 4,000 Kurds | 7,700 |

Casualties and losses
| Unknown | 3,500 Azerbaijani civilians |

The Lakestan incident refers to the failed invasion and massacres led by Simko Shikak in the Lakestan region of West Azerbaijan.

== Background ==
After the end of the World War I, Simko Shikak, who was the head of the Shikak Kurdish tribe, began leading attacks on ethnic Assyrian and Azerbaijani civilians, as well as Iranian authorities, demanding independence for Kurdistan. In 1918, many Kurds west of Lake Urmia pledged allegiance Simko, who began establishing his authority. Simko rapidly grew his Kurdish army in size and strength. The Iranian army could not stop the Kurds loyal to Simko as they were much stronger, therefore Simko captured much lands in West Azerbaijan province, and by 1922 even large cities including Baneh and Sardasht.

The multi-ethnic parts of West Azerbaijan province, especially the cities of Salmas, Urmia, and Khoy, were dangerous, and there were telegrams of pleas from Azerbaijanis and Assyrians who grew increasingly worried about a possible Kurdish invasion. Later, Simko Shikak announced his planned invasion of Lakestan, namely Soltan Ahmad and Qarah Qeshlaq, both of which were inhabited entirely by ethnic Azerbaijanis. Lakestan is near Salmas, and its residents were either cattle breeders, farmers, or chiefs.

== Invasion ==
During December 1919, Simko prepared forces to attack Lakestan. When the people of Lakestan heard, they prepared for war and gathered from nine villages in two places, Soltan Ahmad and Qara Qeshlaq. They brought their wives and children along with them. There were 8,700 locals, although over 340 did not have weapons. The leaders of the Azerbaijanis were Masoud Divan and his brother Sadegh Khan. Taymour Yavur Habshi and Hajireza Qaraqeshlaghi and Karbalaei Ibrahim Khan Qazaljah were also among the companions of Masoud Divan and the chiefs of Lakestan. Before the battle began, Kazem Khan, an Azerbaijani leader from Qushchi, came to Lakestan with fifty of his fighters.

Simko had nearly 4,000 Kurdish troops. On Friday, 19 December, the invasion began as they reached the vicinity of Soltan Ahmad. The Azerbaijanis resisted for two hours before being overwhelmed by the Kurds, who entered the city from all sides and began looting and killing. Civilians who escaped made it to Qara Qeshlaq, while some were killed before they reached it. The Iranian government asked Simko to stop the invasion, although Simko continued it when his demand for 5,000 tomans and 15,000 bullets was not met.

After capturing Soltan Ahmad, Simko led the assault on Qara Qeshlaq. Masoud Divan and his brothers Sadiq Khan and Ibrahim Khan led the defense of Qara Qeshlaq and were able to resist for eleven hours. The battle in Qara Qeshlaq was much bloodier than the one in Soltan Ahmad. Masoud Divan was later killed. The Kurds eventually captured Qara Qeshlaq, while residents escaped at night in the desert, and those who stayed in the village were captured. Many of those who escaped died from the cold, while the survivors reached Sharafkhaneh after 2 days.

Immediately after Simko Shikak captured Lakestan, his fighters massacred part of the ethnic Azeri population which had refused to recognize his authority or pay taxes. In the telegram that survivors of Lakestan sent to Tabriz, they claimed that 3,500 Azerbaijanis had died, with 2,000 of them dying during the battles and 1,500 dying due to the cold weather while they were trying to escape. The deaths created a strong shock in Tabriz, where the people criticised the Iranian government. They compared the Lakestan incident to the Uprising of Sheikh Ubeydullah, where Kurdish rebels infiltrated Iran and nearly reached Tabriz, before failing due to the Shia Azerbaijanis refusing to surrender to Sunni Kurds. Simko held onto Lakestan and the surrounding region north of Lake Urmia until autumn 1919 when an Iranian force organized by Army Commander Intissar and led by Cossack Commander Filipov retook it and Simko fled to his village in Chahriq. Simko stopped his attacks after reaching an agreement with Iran, although he began attacking once again, and his men returned to looting Azerbaijani and Assyrian villages. Immediately after, Simko led an invasion of Urmia, where another battle and more massacres ensued.
