= Kalra =

Kalra may refer to:

- Kalra (surname), including a list of people with the name
- Kalra (village), Punjab, India‌

== See also ==
- Kalray, a French semiconductor company
- Kalra Khasa, a place in Punjab‌, Pakistan‌
- Kalran, a place in West Azerbaijan‌, ‌Iran
- Kalrayan Hills, in Tamil‌ ‌Nadu, India‌
