= Gavlan =

Gavlan or Gulan (Persian: گولان) may refer to various places in Iran:

- Gavlan, East Azerbaijan
- Gulan, Kurdistan
- Gavlan, Koreh Soni, Salmas County, West Azerbaijan Province
- Gavlan, Zulachay, Salmas County, West Azerbaijan Province
- Gulan-e Sofla, Sardasht County, West Azerbaijan Province
- Gavlan, Urmia, West Azerbaijan Province
