= Akhteh Khaneh =

Village in West Azerbaijan province, Iran

Akhteh Khaneh Persian: اخته خانه
- Village
- Location within Iran
- Coordinates: 38°11′02″N 44°52′59″E
- Country: Iran
- Province: West Azerbaijan
- County: Salmas
- District: Central
- Rural District: Lakestan

Population (2016)
  - Total: 542
- Time zone: UTC+3:30 (IRST)

Akhteh Khaneh (Persian: اخته خانه) (Note: Also romanized as Ākhteh Khāneh or Akhtekhaneh; in Armenian: Ախտախանայ) is a village in Lakestan Rural District of the Central District in Salmas County, West Azerbaijan province, Iran.

== Demographics ==
=== Ethnicity ===
There was an Armenian community in Akhteh Khaneh in the late 19th and 20th centuries. Today the population is Turkish.

=== Population ===
At the time of the 2006 National Census, the village's population was 587 in 129 households. The following census in 2011 counted 619 people in 167 households. The 2016 census measured the population of the village as 542 people in 168 households.

== The church ==
The village is home to Surp Asdvadzadzin Church. It was built in 1342 and restored in 1891. "Asvadzadzin" means "Mother of God". It is built of rough stone masonry and kiln bricks and has three domes.

== Location ==
The village is located roughly equidistant between Road 14 and Road 11. The nearest village is Bakhsh Kandi which is approximately 1 mile away.

== Earthquake damage ==
The village was affected by the 1930 Salmas earthquake. All the buildings except the church were destroyed and there were four casualties. The relatively low number of casualties was because the villages felt the tremors so decided to sleep out of doors. The church remained standing but was left with fissures in the walls; it has not been restored.
