= Dareshk =

Dareshk or Dereshk (Persian: درشك) may refer to:

- Dareshk, Kerman
- Dereshk, West Azerbaijan

== See also ==
- Dareshak
