= Khaneh Dam =

Khaneh Dam خانه دام
- Village
- Location within Iran
- Coordinates: 38°18′05″N 45°05′43″E
- Country: Iran
- Province: West Azerbaijan
- County: Salmas
- Bakhsh: Central
- Rural District: Lakestan

Population (2006)
  - Total: 264
- Time zone: UTC+3:30 (IRST)
  - Summer (DST): UTC+4:30 (IRDT)

Khaneh Dam (Persian: خانه دام, also Romanized as Khāneh Dām; also known as Khanadam, Khanasam, Khāndām, Khandam, Khānedām, and Khāneh Sām) is a village in Lakestan Rural District, in the Central District of Salmas County, West Azerbaijan Province, Iran. In the 2006 census, its population was 264, in 68 families.
