= Chichak =

Chichak Village چيچك
- Village
- Location within Iran
- Coordinates: 38°15′53″N 44°47′30″E
- Country: Iran
- Province: West Azerbaijan
- County: Salmas
- Bakhsh: Central
- Rural District: Koreh Soni

Population (2006)
  - Total: 706
- Time zone: UTC+3:30 (IRST)
  - Summer (DST): UTC+4:30 (IRDT)

Chichak (Persian: چيچك, also Romanized as Chīchak) is a village in Koreh Soni Rural District, in the Central District of Salmas County, West Azerbaijan Province, Iran. At the 2006 census, its population was 706, in 147 families.
