= Baghcheh Jik =

Baghcheh Jik باغچه جيك
- Village
- Location within Iran
- Coordinates: 38°10′28″N 44°49′54″E
- Country: Iran
- Province: West Azerbaijan
- County: Salmas
- Bakhsh: Central
- Rural District: Zulachay

Population (2006)
  - Total: 858
- Time zone: UTC+3:30 (IRST)
  - Summer (DST): UTC+4:30 (IRDT)

Baghcheh Jik (Persian: باغچه جيك, also Romanized as Bāghcheh Jīk and Bāghchehjīk, Armenian: Բաղչաջուկ) is a village in Zulachay Rural District, in the Central District of Salmas County, West Azerbaijan Province, Iran. At the 2006 census, its population was 858, in 203 families.
