= Deyr Ali =

Deyr Ali ديرعلي
- Village
- Location within Iran
- Coordinates: 38°20′00″N 44°36′00″E
- Country: Iran
- Province: West Azerbaijan
- County: Salmas
- Bakhsh: Central
- Rural District: Koreh Soni

Population (2006)
  - Total: 520
- Time zone: UTC+3:30 (IRST)
  - Summer (DST): UTC+4:30 (IRDT)

Deyr Ali (Persian: ديرعلي, also Romanized as Deyr ‘Alī) is a village in Koreh Soni Rural District, in the Central District of Salmas County, West Azerbaijan Province, Iran. At the 2006 census, its population was 520, in 85 families.
