= Yushanlu =

Yushanlu or Yavshanlu or Yowshanlu (Persian: يوشانلو) may refer to:

- Yushanlu, Hamadan
- Yushanlu, West Azerbaijan
