= Aqa Esmail =

Aqa Esmail اقااسماعيل
- Village
- Location within Iran
- Coordinates: 38°09′53″N 44°50′41″E
- Country: Iran
- Province: West Azerbaijan
- County: Salmas
- Bakhsh: Central
- Rural District: Zulachay

Population (2006)
  - Total: 306
- Time zone: UTC+3:30 (IRST)
  - Summer (DST): UTC+4:30 (IRDT)

Aqa Esmail (Persian: اقااسماعيل, also Romanized as Āqā Esmā‘īl; also known as Āgh Esmā‘īl, Āgh Esmá”īl, and Agiswail; in Armenian: Աղիսմաիյիլ) is a village in Zulachay Rural District, in the Central District of Salmas County, West Azerbaijan Province, Iran. At the 2006 census, its population was 306, in 76 families.
