= Yalquz Aghaj, West Azerbaijan =

Village in West Azerbaijan province, Iran

Yalquz Aghaj Persian: كنگرلو
- Village
- Location within Iran
- Coordinates: 38°13′47″N 44°56′19″E
- Country: Iran
- Province: West Azerbaijan
- County: Salmas
- District: Central
- Rural District: Lakestan

Population (2016)
  - Total: 1,176
- Time zone: UTC+3:30 (IRST)

Yalquz Aghaj (Persian: يالقوزاغاج) (Note: Also romanized as Yālqūz Āghāj) is a village in Lakestan Rural District of the Central District in Salmas County, West Azerbaijan province, Iran.

== Demographics ==
=== Population ===
At the time of the 2006 National Census, the village's population was 1,247 in 293 households. The following census in 2011 counted 1,239 people in 346 households. The 2016 census measured the population of the village as 1,176 people in 333 households.
