= Dereshk, West Azerbaijan =

Dereshk درشك
- Village
- Location within Iran
- Coordinates: 38°09′26″N 44°49′08″E
- Country: Iran
- Province: West Azerbaijan
- County: Salmas
- Bakhsh: Central
- Rural District: Zulachay

Population (2006)
  - Total: 508
- Time zone: UTC+3:30 (IRST)
  - Summer (DST): UTC+4:30 (IRDT)

Dereshk (Persian: درشك; also known as Derīshk; in Armenian: Դերիշկ or Դրիշկ) is a village in Zulachay Rural District, in the Central District of Salmas County, West Azerbaijan Province, Iran. At the 2006 census, its population was 508, in 116 families.
