= Shurik, Salmas =

Village in West Azerbaijan province, Iran

Shurik Persian: شوريك
- Village
- Location within Iran
- Coordinates: 38°19′06″N 44°46′32″E
- Country: Iran
- Province: West Azerbaijan
- County: Salmas
- District: Central
- Rural District: Koreh Soni

Population (2016)
  - Total: 1,456
- Time zone: UTC+3:30 (IRST)

Shurik (Persian: شوريك) (Note: Also romanized as Shoorik and Shūrīk; also known as Shorik) is a village in Koreh Soni Rural District of the Central District in Salmas County, West Azerbaijan province, Iran.

== Demographics ==
=== Population ===
At the time of the 2006 National Census, the village's population was 1,182 in 222 households. The following census in 2011 counted 1,394 people in 366 households. The 2016 census measured the population of the village as 1,456 people in 389 households.
