= Sourp Asdvadzadzin (Sarnaq) =

Church building in Sarnaq, Iran

Religion
- Affiliation: Armenian Apostolic Church
- Province: West Azerbaijan Province

Location
- Location: Sarnaq, Iran

Architecture
- Type: Church
- Completed: 1625
- Height (max): 6.5m

Sourp Asdvadzadzin ("Holy Mother of God", Armenian: Սուրբ Աստվածածին) is an Armenian Apostolic stone masonry church in Sarnaq, Iran. The church was built in 1625. The church was built 6.5 metres high, with six columns. It spans 15x10 metres. The building material was 'yellow stones' and basalt. The church was renovated in the 19th century. There are a number of tombstones around the church, possibly belonging to members of a wealthy family that financed its renovation.

The church was damaged in the 1930 Salmas earthquake, its western wall, wooden roof and three out of four central pillars fell down. As of 2013, only the northern wall remains intact. The southern wall of the church has completely fallen down.

== See also ==
- List of Armenian churches in Iran
