= Saray-e Malek =

Village in West Azerbaijan province, Iran

Saray-e Malek Persian: سراي ملك
- Village
- Location within Iran
- Coordinates: 38°16′08″N 44°45′31″E
- Country: Iran
- Province: West Azerbaijan
- County: Salmas
- District: Central
- Rural District: Koreh Soni

Population (2016)
  - Total: 1,140
- Time zone: UTC+3:30 (IRST)

Saray-e Malek (Persian: سراي ملك) (Note: Also romanized as Sarāy-e Malek; also known as Sarā-ye Malek; in Armenian: Սարամերիկ) is a village in Koreh Soni Rural District of the Central District in Salmas County, West Azerbaijan province, Iran.

== Demographics ==
=== Population ===
At the time of the 2006 National Census, the village's population was 1,005 in 187 households. The following census in 2011 counted 1,180 people in 327 households. The 2016 census measured the population of the village as 1,140 people in 313 households.
