= Hadar, Salmas =

Village in West Azerbaijan province, Iran

Hadar Persian: هدر
- Village
- Location within Iran
- Coordinates: 38°18′19″N 44°43′53″E
- Country: Iran
- Province: West Azerbaijan
- County: Salmas
- District: Central
- Rural District: Koreh Soni

Population (2016)
  - Total: 1,211
- Time zone: UTC+3:30 (IRST)

Hadar (Persian: هدر) (Note: In Armenian: Հովադար) is a village in Koreh Soni Rural District of the Central District in Salmas County, West Azerbaijan province, Iran.

== Demographics ==
=== Population ===
At the time of the 2006 National Census, the village's population was 1,036 in 210 households. The following census in 2011 counted 1,223 people in 302 households. The 2016 census measured the population of the village as 1,211 people in 305 households.
