= Sadaqian =

Village in West Azerbaijan province, Iran

Sadaqian Persian: صدقيان
- Village
- Location within Iran
- Coordinates: 38°12′37″N 44°50′19″E
- Country: Iran
- Province: West Azerbaijan
- County: Salmas
- District: Central
- Rural District: Lakestan

Population (2016)
  - Total: 925
- Time zone: UTC+3:30 (IRST)

Sadaqian (Persian: صدقيان) (Note: Also romanized as Sadaqeyān, Şadaqīān, and Sadaqyān) is a village in Lakestan Rural District of the Central District in Salmas County, West Azerbaijan province, Iran.

== Demographics ==
=== Population ===
At the time of the 2006 National Census, the village's population was 954 in 197 households. The following census in 2011 counted 964 people in 256 households. The 2016 census measured the population of the village as 925 people in 268 households.
