= Moghanjuq =

Village in West Azerbaijan province, Iran

Moghanjuq Persian: مغانجوق
- Village
- Location within Iran
- Coordinates: 38°14′01″N 44°46′05″E
- Country: Iran
- Province: West Azerbaijan
- County: Salmas
- District: Central
- Rural District: Zulachay

Population (2016)
  - Total: 5,209
- Time zone: UTC+3:30 (IRST)

Moghanjuq (Persian: مغانجوق) (Note: Also romanized as Moghānjūq; also known as Moghānjīq and Muwanjik; in Armenian: Մուղանջուղ) is a village in Zulachay Rural District of the Central District in Salmas County, West Azerbaijan province, Iran.

== Demographics ==
=== Population ===
At the time of the 2006 National Census, the village's population was 2,963 in 798 households. The following census in 2011 counted 4,002 people in 1,182 households. The 2016 census measured the population of the village as 5,209 people in 1,588 households.
