= Sarnaq =

Village in West Azerbaijan province, Iran

Sarnaq Persian: سرنق
- Village
- Location within Iran
- Coordinates: 38°08′08″N 44°46′13″E
- Country: Iran
- Province: West Azerbaijan
- County: Salmas
- District: Central
- Rural District: Zulachay

Population (2016)
  - Total: 905
- Time zone: UTC+3:30 (IRST)

Sarnaq (Persian: سرنق) (Note: Also known as Sarna (سارنا); Armenian: Սառնա) is a village in Zulachay Rural District of the Central District in Salmas County, West Azerbaijan province, Iran.

== Demographics ==
=== Ethnicity ===
The population is mainly Azeri.

=== Population ===
As of 1930, the village had a population of around 180. At the time of the 2006 National Census, the village's population was 914 in 223 households. The following census in 2011 counted 961 people in 276 households. The 2016 census measured the population of the village as 905 people in 273 households.

== Salmas earthquake ==
Sarnaq was badly damaged in the 1930 Salmas earthquake. The three churches of the village were damaged. Sourp Asdvadzadzin, an Armenian masonry church built in 1625, lost one of its walls. Mar Khinah church (built with sun dried bricks) was lost all of its outer walls, but was rebuilt. S. Hovanes was destroyed and never rebuilt.
