= Kanian, Salmas =

Village in West Azerbaijan province, Iran

Kanian Persian: كانيان
- Village
- Location within Iran
- Coordinates: 38°18′35″N 44°51′52″E
- Country: Iran
- Province: West Azerbaijan
- County: Salmas
- District: Central
- Rural District: Koreh Soni

Population (2016)
  - Total: 1,214
- Time zone: UTC+3:30 (IRST)

Kanian (Persian: كانيان) (Note: Also romanized as Kānīān) is a village in Koreh Soni Rural District of the Central District in Salmas County, West Azerbaijan province, Iran.

== Demographics ==
=== Population ===
At the time of the 2006 National Census, the village's population was 1,151 in 225 households. The following census in 2011 counted 1,204 people in 306 households. The 2016 census measured the population of the village as 1,214 people in 315 households.
