= Bargoshad, West Azerbaijan =

Village in West Azerbaijan province, Iran

Bargoshad Persian: برگشاد
- Village
- Location within Iran
- Coordinates: 38°13′45″N 44°49′32″E
- Country: Iran
- Province: West Azerbaijan
- County: Salmas
- District: Central
- Rural District: Lakestan

Population (2016)
  - Total: 390
- Time zone: UTC+3:30 (IRST)

Bargoshad (Persian: برگشاد) (Note: Also romanized as Bargoshād) is a village in Lakestan Rural District of the Central District in Salmas County, West Azerbaijan province, Iran.

== Demographics ==
=== Population ===
At the time of the 2006 National Census, the village's population was 437 in 103 households. The following census in 2011 counted 400 people in 114 households. The 2016 census measured the population of the village as 390 people in 121 households.
