= Hamzeh Kandi =

Village in West Azerbaijan province, Iran

Hamzeh Kandi Persian: حمزه كندي
- Village
- Location within Iran
- Coordinates: 38°13′16″N 44°50′54″E
- Country: Iran
- Province: West Azerbaijan
- County: Salmas
- District: Central
- Rural District: Lakestan

Population (2016)
  - Total: 949
- Time zone: UTC+3:30 (IRST)

Hamzeh Kandi (Persian: حمزه كندي) (Note: Also romanized as Ḩamzeh Kandī) is a village in Lakestan Rural District of the Central District in Salmas County, West Azerbaijan province, Iran.

== Demographics ==
=== Population ===
At the time of the 2006 National Census, the village's population was 1,000 in 244 households. The following census in 2011 counted 1,011 people in 284 households. The 2016 census measured the population of the village as 949 people in 281 households.
