= Silab, West Azerbaijan =

Village in West Azerbaijan province, Iran

Silab Persian: سيلاب
- Village
- Location within Iran
- Coordinates: 38°18′51″N 44°45′38″E
- Country: Iran
- Province: West Azerbaijan
- County: Salmas
- District: Central
- Rural District: Koreh Soni

Population (2016)
  - Total: 4,505
- Time zone: UTC+3:30 (IRST)

Silab (Persian: سيلاب) (Note: Also romanized as Sīlāb) is a village in, and the capital of, Koreh Soni Rural District in the Central District of Salmas County, West Azerbaijan province, Iran.

== Demographics ==
=== Population ===
At the time of the 2006 National Census, the village's population was 3,652 in 794 households. The following census in 2011 counted 4,300 people in 1,043 households. The 2016 census measured the population of the village as 4,505 people in 1,085 households. It was the most populous village in its rural district.
