= Ureban =

Village in West Azerbaijan province, Iran

Ureban Persian: اوربان
- Village
- Location within Iran
- Coordinates: 38°20′31″N 44°43′16″E
- Country: Iran
- Province: West Azerbaijan
- County: Salmas
- District: Central
- Rural District: Koreh Soni

Population (2016)
  - Total: 1,240
- Time zone: UTC+3:30 (IRST)

Ureban (Persian: اوربان) (Note: Also romanized as Ūrebān; Armenian: Ուրբան or Օրբան) is a village in Koreh Soni Rural District of the Central District in Salmas County, West Azerbaijan province, Iran.

== Demographics ==
=== Population ===
At the time of the 2006 National Census, the village's population was 1,003 in 181 households. The following census in 2011 counted 1,182 people in 225 households. The 2016 census measured the population of the village as 1,240 people in 301 households.
