= Golozan =

Golozan گلعذان
- Village
- Location within Iran
- Coordinates: 38°08′44″N 44°43′22″E
- Country: Iran
- Province: West Azerbaijan
- County: Salmas
- Bakhsh: Central
- Rural District: Zulachay

Population (2006)
  - Total: 657
- Time zone: UTC+3:30 (IRST)
  - Summer (DST): UTC+4:30 (IRDT)

Golozan (Persian: گلعذان, also Romanized as Gol‘oz̄ān, Guliser or Gül’zan; in Armenian: Գիւլիզան) is a village in Zulachay Rural District, in the Central District of Salmas County, West Azerbaijan Province, Iran. At the 2006 census, its population was 657, in 176 families.
