= Kangarlu, West Azerbaijan =

Village in West Azerbaijan province, Iran

Kangarlu Persian: كنگرلو
- Village
- Location within Iran
- Coordinates: 38°13′21″N 44°59′55″E
- Country: Iran
- Province: West Azerbaijan
- County: Salmas
- District: Central
- Rural District: Lakestan

Population (2016)
  - Total: 1,117
- Time zone: UTC+3:30 (IRST)

Kangarlu (Persian: كنگرلو) (Note: Also romanized as Kangarloo and Kangarlū) is a village in Lakestan Rural District of the Central District in Salmas County, West Azerbaijan province, Iran.

== Demographics ==
=== Population ===
At the time of the 2006 National Census, the village's population was 1,247 in 298 households. The following census in 2011 counted 1,252 people in 347 households. The 2016 census measured the population of the village as 1,117 people in 350 households.
