= Bakhsh Kandi =

Bakhsh Kandi بخش كندي
- Village
- Location within Iran
- Coordinates: 38°11′11″N 44°51′42″E
- Country: Iran
- Province: West Azerbaijan
- County: Salmas
- Bakhsh: Central
- Rural District: Lakestan

Population (2006)
  - Total: 366
- Time zone: UTC+3:30 (IRST)
  - Summer (DST): UTC+4:30 (IRDT)

Bakhsh Kandi (Persian: بخش كندي, also Romanized as Bakhsh Kandī) is a village in Lakestan Rural District, in the Central District of Salmas County, West Azerbaijan Province, Iran. At the 2006 census, its population was 366, in 91 families.
