= Vardan, Iran =

Village in West Azerbaijan province, Iran

Vardan Persian: وردان
- Village
- Location within Iran
- Coordinates: 38°15′43″N 44°44′29″E
- Country: Iran
- Province: West Azerbaijan
- County: Salmas
- District: Central
- Rural District: Koreh Soni

Population (2016)
  - Total: 3,086
- Time zone: UTC+3:30 (IRST)

Vardan (Persian: وردان) (Note: Also romanized as Vardān; in Armenian: Վարդան) is a village in Koreh Soni Rural District of the Central District in Salmas County, West Azerbaijan province, Iran.

== Demographics ==
=== Population ===
At the time of the 2006 National Census, the village's population was 2,285 in 446 households. The following census in 2011 counted 2,696 people in 721 households. The 2016 census measured the population of the village as 3,086 people in 846 households.
