= Chubanluy-e Sofla =

Chubanluy-e Sofla چوبانلوي سفلي
- Village
- Location within Iran
- Coordinates: 38°15′51″N 45°01′31″E
- Country: Iran
- Province: West Azerbaijan
- County: Salmas
- Bakhsh: Central
- Rural District: Lakestan

Population (2006)
  - Total: 159
- Time zone: UTC+3:30 (IRST)
  - Summer (DST): UTC+4:30 (IRDT)

Chubanluy-e Sofla (Persian: چوبانلوي سفلي, also Romanized as Chūbānlūy-e Soflá; also known as Chūpānlū-ye Pā’īn, Chūpānlū-ye Soflá, and Ḩeydarābād) is a village in Lakestan Rural District, in the Central District of Salmas County, West Azerbaijan province, Iran. At the 2006 census, its population was 159, in 35 families.
