= Chubanluy-e Olya =

Chubanluy-e Olya چوبانلوي عليا
- Village
- Location within Iran
- Coordinates: 38°17′18″N 45°01′49″E
- Country: Iran
- Province: West Azerbaijan
- County: Salmas
- Bakhsh: Central
- Rural District: Lakestan

Population (2006)
  - Total: 170
- Time zone: UTC+3:30 (IRST)
  - Summer (DST): UTC+4:30 (IRDT)

Chubanluy-e Olya (Persian: چوبانلوي عليا, also Romanized as Chūbānlūy-e 'Olyā; also known as Chobānlī, Chūpānlū, Chūpānlū-ye Bālā, and Chūpānlū-ye 'Olyā) is a village in Lakestan Rural District, in the Central District of Salmas County, West Azerbaijan province, Iran. At the 2006 census, its population was 170, in 41 families.
