= Owlaq =

Owlaq اولق
- Village
- Location within Iran
- Coordinates: 38°09′06″N 44°44′47″E
- Country: Iran
- Province: West Azerbaijan
- County: Salmas
- Bakhsh: Central
- Rural District: Zulachay

Population (2006)
  - Total: 654
- Time zone: UTC+3:30 (IRST)
  - Summer (DST): UTC+4:30 (IRDT)

Owlaq (Persian: اولق; in Armenian: Ուլա) is a village in Zulachay Rural District, in the Central District of Salmas County, West Azerbaijan Province, Iran. At the 2006 census, its population was 654, in 189 families.
