= 1930 Salmas earthquake =

Magnitude 7.1 earthquake in Iran

- Location within Iran
- UTC time: 1930-05-06 22:34:26
- ISC event: 907354
- USGS-ANSS: ComCat
- Local date: 7 May 1930
- Local time: 01:34:26 IRST
- Magnitude: 7.1 M_{w}
- Depth: 15 km (9.3 mi)
- Epicenter: 38.09°N 44.78°E
- Fault: Salmas Fault
- Type: Oblique-slip
- Areas affected: Iran, Turkey
- Max. intensity: MMI IX (Violent)
- Landslides: Yes
- Foreshocks: 5.4 mb May 6 at 07:03:26
- Casualties: 1,360–3,000 killed

The 1930 Salmas earthquake occurred on 7 May at 01:34:26 IRST in West Azerbaijan province, Iran. The earthquake, which was among Iran's largest, measured 7.1 on the moment magnitude scale and had a maximum Mercalli intensity of IX (Violent). Prior to the earthquake a strong foreshock was felt fifteen hours earlier. Reports from seismologists and seismological organizations indicate that up to 3,000 fatalities may have occurred in northwest Iran and southeast Turkey.

Sixty villages (including the large settlement of Dilman, which was relocated and rebuilt as Salmas) were destroyed in the Salmas Plain and in the surrounding mountainous regions. A sequence of aftershocks affected many villages, inflicting damage on some that had escaped devastation during the mainshock. An inspection of the region was undertaken, but not until decades later, at which time substantial surface faulting and other ground effects were documented.

== Preface ==
The epicentral area in the Salmas Plain covers 300 square kilometres (120 sq mi) and is positioned northwest of Lake Urmia. This area had been inhabited primarily by Christians for about a thousand years prior to the event, though in the then-extant town of Dilman (later rebuilt and renamed Shahpur) and villages in the north and east the population was primarily Turkish and Kurdish. The mountainous areas surrounding the plain are extremely isolated with villages that are spread far apart. Montane villagers sustained themselves primarily on wheat and cattle farming. To the west, near the Turkish border, lies Aravil Dagi, a volcano that is the highest peak in the region.

== Foreshock ==
A relatively strong foreshock occurred at about 10:03:26 IRST on 6 May in the same area as the mainshock. This destructive event caused 25 fatalities and was felt as far as northwestern Azerbaijan and southeastern Turkey. Damage to adobe homes was substantial. Roofs and walls collapsed and in some instances whole homes were demolished. Many of the villagers in the valley spent the following night outdoors and were spared during the main event, but in the mountainous villages where the shock was not felt as strongly (Shekar Yazi, Sheydan, Ashnak, Aslanik, and others) the population was not as concerned. Many slept indoors and this led to high casualties in those areas during the mainshock a little more than 15 hours later.

== Earthquake ==
Aftershocks ≥ M5
M	Date	Time (UTC)
5	8 May	05:29:32
5	8 May	15:05:28
6.25	8 May	15:35:28
5	8 May	23:38:22
5	10 May	21:43:33
5.25	23 May	09:48:23
5.5	29 May	17:14:59
5.25	4 June	07:28:08
5.25	3 August	22:05:59
Tchalenko & Berberian 1974, pp. 204, 206

The earthquake was a result of oblique-slip faulting, and was felt over a very wide area, from Leninakan in Armenia and Tbilisi in Georgia in the north, and Baghdad and Kirkuk in Iraq to the south. Dextral strike-slip motion, along with dip-slip motion (normal faulting, northeast side down) occurred on a fault trending west-northwest. The United States' National Geophysical Data Center lists 1,360 fatalities for the event, while the Belgian Centre for Research on the Epidemiology of Disasters' EM-DAT database and Ambraseys & Melville 2005 both list 2,500. Tchalenko & Berberian 1974, the USGS' PAGER loss estimate database, and Utsu 2002 all state 2,514. The Utsu list also acknowledges other estimates of 1,360 and 3,000.

=== Damage ===
Sixty villages and about 40 Armenian churches were destroyed in the southwest Salmas Plain and the surrounding mountainous regions. In the zone of heaviest damage (bounded by the villages of Kohneh Shahr, Payajuk and Zaviehjuk) all the homes and all but one of the churches were destroyed. To the east of this area, the large village of Dilman reportedly had 1,100 casualties, but seismologists J. S. Tchalenko and M. Berberian questioned the reliability of this figure. In smaller villages, survivors provided an accurate count of those lost because they remembered the victims by name, but in a village of 18,000, survivors were unable to grasp the extent of the losses. Only two homes remained standing there, and the village was renamed Salmas and moved to a new location to the west.

The villages in the mountains to the south, west, and north of the Salmas Plain were generally smaller, and accounted for about half of the total number of villages that were lost. The foreshock was not felt at Borusliqalan (the westernmost village that was destroyed) and the losses were high. The foreshock was also not strongly felt to the east of Lake Urmia (and to the southwest of Tabriz) where the village of Mamaqan was completely destroyed and 85 people were killed. Other nearby villages went almost unscathed, with the differing amounts of damage being attributed to soil type.

=== Ground effects ===
A post-earthquake survey of the land was undertaken by seismologists N. N. Ambraseys and C. P. Melville, but it was not completed until the mid-1970s. At that time, 16 kilometres (9.9 mi) of surface breaks with right-lateral offsets between 1–4 metres (3 ft 3 in – 13 ft 1 in) were located between the villages of Shurgil and Kuhneh Shahr. Substantial vertical movement of the west-northwest trending fault was also seen, with even greater maximum displacements of 4–6 metres (13–20 ft), but the average vertical slip was about 1.2 metres (3 ft 11 in) throughout the extent of the observed surface faulting. They estimated that about 30 kilometres (19 mi) of visible fault breaks were present immediately following the shocks, but by the time they had completed their survey 45 years later about half of the surface features had succumbed to erosion. Other effects included disturbed stream and spring flow, water table fluctuations, and landslides.

== Aftershocks ==
A series of strong and damaging aftershocks persisted for about three-and-a-half months. The largest in the sequence came on 8 May. The event caused additional destruction to the northeast of the initial meizoseismal area. Qatur, which had been nearly destroyed by the mainshock, took another serious hit. Other villages (Chaliyan, Givaran, Mir 'Umar, and Ravyan) also experienced major destruction. Shekar Yazi was a village in the southeast region that had not been seriously affected by the mainshock, but experienced heavy damage during the 8 May event. This shock resulted in four additional deaths.

== See also ==
- Geography of Iran
- Hakkâri
- Iranian plateau
- List of earthquakes in 1930
- List of earthquakes in Iran
- List of earthquakes in Turkey
