= Yushanlu, West Azerbaijan =

Yushanlu يوشانلو
- Village
- Location within Iran
- Coordinates: 38°13′20″N 44°58′16″E
- Country: Iran
- Province: West Azerbaijan
- County: Salmas
- Bakhsh: Central
- Rural District: Lakestan

Population (2006)
  - Total: 269
- Time zone: UTC+3:30 (IRST)
  - Summer (DST): UTC+4:30 (IRDT)

Yushanlu (Persian: يوشانلو, also Romanized as Yūshānlū, Yavshanlu, and Yowshānlū; also known as Yoshanloo and Būshānlū) is a village in Lakestan Rural District, in the Central District of Salmas County, West Azerbaijan Province, Iran. At the 2006 census, its population was 269, in 65 families.

The main industries are agriculture and rearing livestock. The name is derived for the name of a plant which grows in the area.
