= Stepanos V of Salmast =

Armenian Apostolic Catholicos from 1547 to 1567

Step'anos V of Salmast, otherwise known as Stepanos V Salmastetsi (b. ? Salmas – d. 1567 Etchmiadzin), was Catholicos of All Armenians from 1547 to 1567.

== Biography ==
Stepanos was born in Salmas in the Safavid Empire. In 1545, he was elected Catholicos. Two years later, in 1547, amidst the still ongoing and devastating Ottoman–Safavid War of 1532–1555, Stephen convened a secret meeting of which the result was to send a delegation headed by him to the Pope to plead for the liberation of Armenia. The group, which included Stepanos V, visited several European courts as well, including that of German Emperor Charles V.

Stepanos initiated talks with Rome for the Armenian Church become under the authority of the Catholic Church in exchange for Rome's support to Armenian emancipatory activities, but these efforts didn't lead to a unification.

== Sources ==
- Adalian, Rouben Paul (2010). Historical Dictionary of Armenia (2 ed.). Scarecrow Press. ISBN 978-0810874503.
- Gérard Dédéyan (ed.), Histoire du peuple arménien, Toulouse, Éd. Privat, 2007 (1re éd. 1982), pp. 339, 400, 460. ISBN 978-2-7089-6874-5. (in French)
- Joseph Fr. Michaud et Louis Gabriel Michaud, Biographie universelle, ancienne et moderne, Paris, 1825, Tome XIII p. 442. (in French)
- Payaslian, S. (2008). The History of Armenia. Springer. p. 108. ISBN 978-0230608580.

Religious titles
Preceded by Gregory XI	Catholicos of the Holy See of St. Echmiadzin and All Armenians; 1545–1567	Succeeded by Michael I
