= Sureh, West Azerbaijan =

Village in West Azerbaijan province, Iran

Sureh Persian: سوره
- Village
- Location within Iran
- Coordinates: 38°10′42″N 44°43′39″E
- Country: Iran
- Province: West Azerbaijan
- County: Salmas
- District: Central
- Rural District: Zulachay

Population (2016)
  - Total: 1,258
- Time zone: UTC+3:30 (IRST)

Sureh (Persian: سوره) (Note: Also romanized as Sūreh; also known as Sawraa; in Armenian: Սաւրա) is a village in Zulachay Rural District of the Central District in Salmas County, West Azerbaijan province, Iran.

== Demographics ==
=== Population ===
At the time of the 2006 National Census, the village's population was 1,506 in 387 households. The following census in 2011 counted 1,470 people in 445 households. The 2016 census measured the population of the village as 1,258 people in 412 households.
