= Patah Vir =

Village in West Azerbaijan province, Iran

Patah Vir Persian: پته وير
- Village
- Location within Iran
- Coordinates: 38°09′01″N 44°42′15″E
- Country: Iran
- Province: West Azerbaijan
- County: Salmas
- District: Central
- Rural District: Zulachay

Population (2016)
  - Total: 823
- Time zone: UTC+3:30 (IRST)

Patah Vir (Persian: پته وير) (Note: Also romanized as Patah Vīr and Patahvīr; also known as Patamur; in Armenian: Փաթաւոր) is a village in Zulachay Rural District of the Central District in Salmas County, West Azerbaijan province, Iran.

== Demographics ==
=== Population ===
At the time of the 2006 National Census, the village's population was 938 in 177 households. The following census in 2011 counted 1,004 people in 231 households. The 2016 census measured the population of the village as 823 people in 217 households.
