= Malham, Salmas =

Village in West Azerbaijan province, Iran

Malham Persian: ملحم
- Village
- Location within Iran
- Coordinates: 38°07′55″N 44°44′18″E
- Country: Iran
- Province: West Azerbaijan
- County: Salmas
- District: Central
- Rural District: Zulachay

Population (2016)
  - Total: 5,215
- Time zone: UTC+3:30 (IRST)

Malham (Persian: ملحم) (Note: Also romanized as Malḩam; Armenian: Մահլամ) is a village in, and the capital of, Zulachay Rural District in the Central District of Salmas County, West Azerbaijan province, Iran.

== Demographics ==
=== Population ===
At the time of the 2006 National Census, the village's population was 4,576 in 815 households. The following census in 2011 counted 5,315 people in 1,218 households. The 2016 census measured the population of the village as 5,215 people in 1,242 households.
