= Kalra (village) =

- Village
- Location in Punjab, India Kalra (India)
- Coordinates: 31.3978791°N 75.7681344°E
- Country: India
- State: Punjab
- District: Jalandhar

Government
  - Type: Panchayat raj
  - Body: Gram panchayat
- Elevation: 240 m (790 ft)

Languages
  - Official: Punjabi
- Time zone: UTC+5:30 (IST)
- ISO 3166 code: IN-PB
- Website: jalandhar.nic.in

Kalra is a village in Jalandhar district of Punjab State, India. It is located 30 kilometres (19 mi) from district headquarter Jalandhar and 147 kilometres (91 mi) from state capital Chandigarh. The village is administered by a sarpanch who is an elected representative of the village as per the Panchayati raj (India).

== See also ==
- Jalpot
- List of villages in India
