= Qarah Qeshlaq, Salmas =

Village in West Azerbaijan province, Iran

Qarah Qeshlaq Persian: قره قشلاق
- Village
- Location within Iran
- Coordinates: 38°12′16″N 44°57′09″E
- Country: Iran
- Province: West Azerbaijan
- County: Salmas
- District: Central
- Rural District: Lakestan

Population (2016)
  - Total: 2,040
- Time zone: UTC+3:30 (IRST)

Qarah Qeshlaq (Persian: قره قشلاق) (Note: Also romanized as Qarah Qeshlāq and Qareh Qeshlāq) is a village in, and the capital of, Lakestan Rural District in the Central District of Salmas County, West Azerbaijan province, Iran. The previous capital of the rural district was the village of Soltan Ahmad.

== Demographics ==
=== Population ===
At the time of the 2006 National Census, the village's population was 2,126 in 552 households. The following census in 2011 counted 2,256 people in 628 households. The 2016 census measured the population of the village as 2,040 people in 647 households. It was the most populous village in its rural district.
