= Gavlan, Zulachay =

Village in West Azerbaijan province, Iran

Gavlan Persian: گولان
- Village
- Location within Iran
- Coordinates: 38°10′11″N 44°49′06″E
- Country: Iran
- Province: West Azerbaijan
- County: Salmas
- District: Central
- Rural District: Zulachay

Population (2016)
  - Total: 814
- Time zone: UTC+3:30 (IRST)

Gavlan (Persian: گولان) (Note: Also romanized as Gavlān and Gūlān) is a village in Zulachay Rural District of the Central District in Salmas County, West Azerbaijan province, Iran.

== Demographics ==
=== Population ===
At the time of the 2006 National Census, the village's population was 209 in 40 households. The following census in 2011 counted 634 people in 139 households. The 2016 census measured the population of the village as 814 people in 188 households.
