= Pekajik =

Pekajik پكاجيك
- Village
- Location within Iran
- Coordinates: 38°21′00″N 44°38′00″E
- Country: Iran
- Province: West Azerbaijan
- County: Salmas
- Bakhsh: Central
- Rural District: Zulachay

Population (2006)
  - Total: 441
- Time zone: UTC+3:30 (IRST)
  - Summer (DST): UTC+4:30 (IRDT)

Pekajik (Persian: پكاجيك, romanized: Pekājīk, Azerbaijani: Pəyəcik is a village in Zulachay Rural District, in the Central District of Salmas County, West Azerbaijan Province, Iran. At the 2006 census, its population was 441, in 109 families. The site has been historically inhabited by Armenians.
