= Kalashan =

Village in West Azerbaijan province, Iran

Kalashan Persian: كلشان
- Village
- Location within Iran
- Coordinates: 38°08′36″N 44°47′44″E
- Country: Iran
- Province: West Azerbaijan
- County: Salmas
- District: Central
- Rural District: Zulachay

Population (2016)
  - Total: 1,337
- Time zone: UTC+3:30 (IRST)

Kalashan (Persian: كلشان) (Note: Also romanized as Kalashān; in Armenian: Քեալաշան) is a village in Zulachay Rural District of the Central District in Salmas County, West Azerbaijan province, Iran.

== Demographics ==
=== Population ===
At the time of the 2006 National Census, the village's population was 1,417 in 330 households. The following census in 2011 counted 1,459 people in 395 households. The 2016 census measured the population of the village as 1,337 people in 403 households.
