= Chabinlu =

Chabinlu چبينلو
- Village
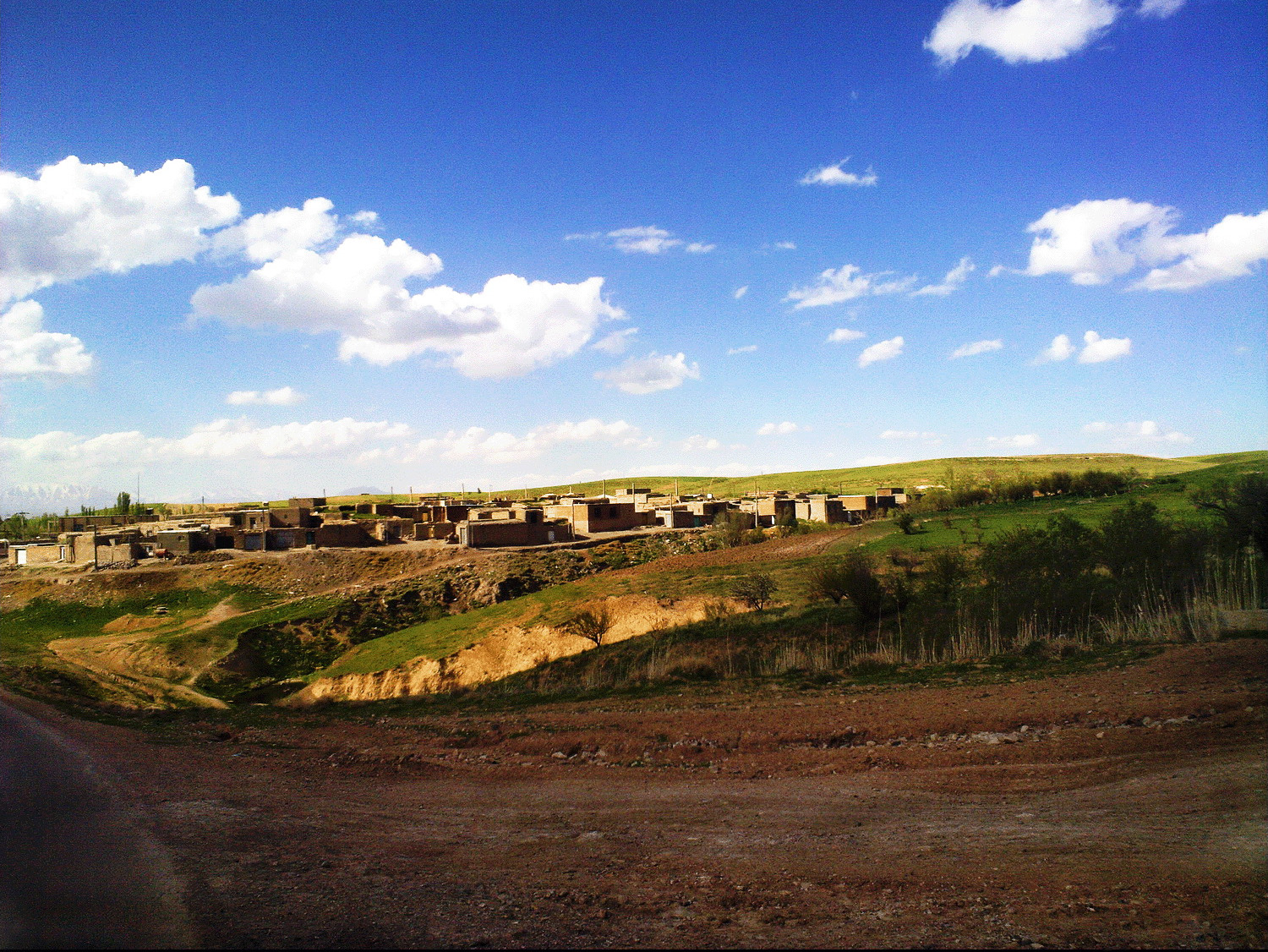

- Location within Iran
- Coordinates: 37°17′00″N 46°35′25″E
- Country: Iran
- Province: East Azerbaijan
- County: Maragheh
- Bakhsh: Saraju
- Rural District: Sarajuy-ye Sharqi

Population (2006)
  - Total: 224
- Time zone: UTC+3:30 (IRST)
  - Summer (DST): UTC+4:30 (IRDT)

Chabinlu (Persian: چبينلو, also Romanized as Chabīnlū; also known as Chabānlū and Chapanlū) is a village in Sarajuy-ye Sharqi Rural District, Saraju District, Maragheh County, East Azerbaijan province, Iran. At the 2006 census, its population was 224, in 50 families.
