= Soltan Ahmad =

Village in West Azerbaijan province, Iran

Soltan Ahmad Persian: سلطان احمد
- Village
- Location within Iran
- Coordinates: 38°12′30″N 44°55′51″E
- Country: Iran
- Province: West Azerbaijan
- County: Salmas
- District: Central
- Rural District: Lakestan

Population (2016)
  - Total: 1,165
- Time zone: UTC+3:30 (IRST)

Soltan Ahmad (Persian: سلطان احمد) (Note: Also romanized as Solţān Aḩmad) is a village in, and the former capital of, Lakestan Rural District in the Central District of Salmas County, West Azerbaijan province, Iran. The capital of the rural district has been transferred to the village of Qarah Qeshlaq.

== Demographics ==
=== Population ===
At the time of the 2006 National Census, the village's population was 1,379 in 346 households. The following census in 2011 counted 1,419 people in 394 households. The 2016 census measured the population of the village as 1,165 people in 301 households.
