= Kalra Khasa =

Coordinates: 32°32′45.5″N 74°05′28.7″E

Kalra Khasa کا لرہ خا صہ
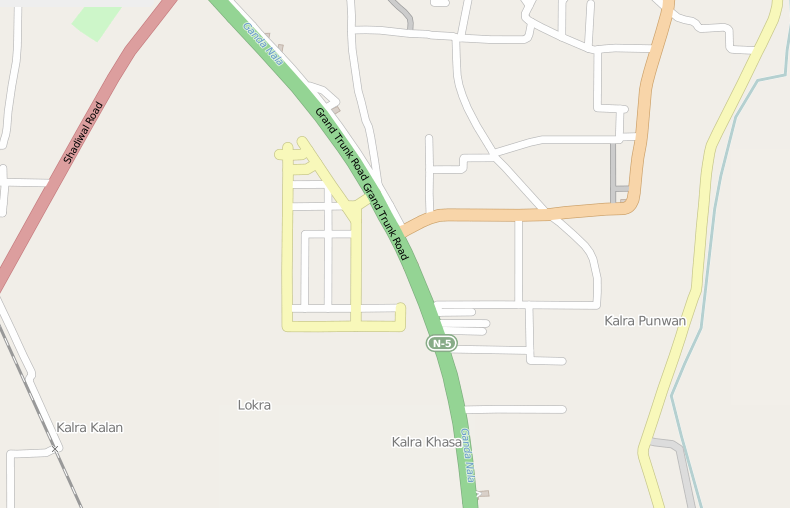
- Kalra Khasa situated near GT Road
- Country: Pakistan
- Province: Punjab
- District: Gujrat
- Time zone: UTC+5 (PST)
- Calling code: 053

Kalra Khasa (Urdu: کا لرہ خا صہ) is a village in Gujrat District, of the Punjab province, Pakistan. The village is situated near GT Road Industrial area.
