= Tazeh Shahr =

City in West Azerbaijan province, Iran

Tazeh Shahr Persian: تازه شهر
- City
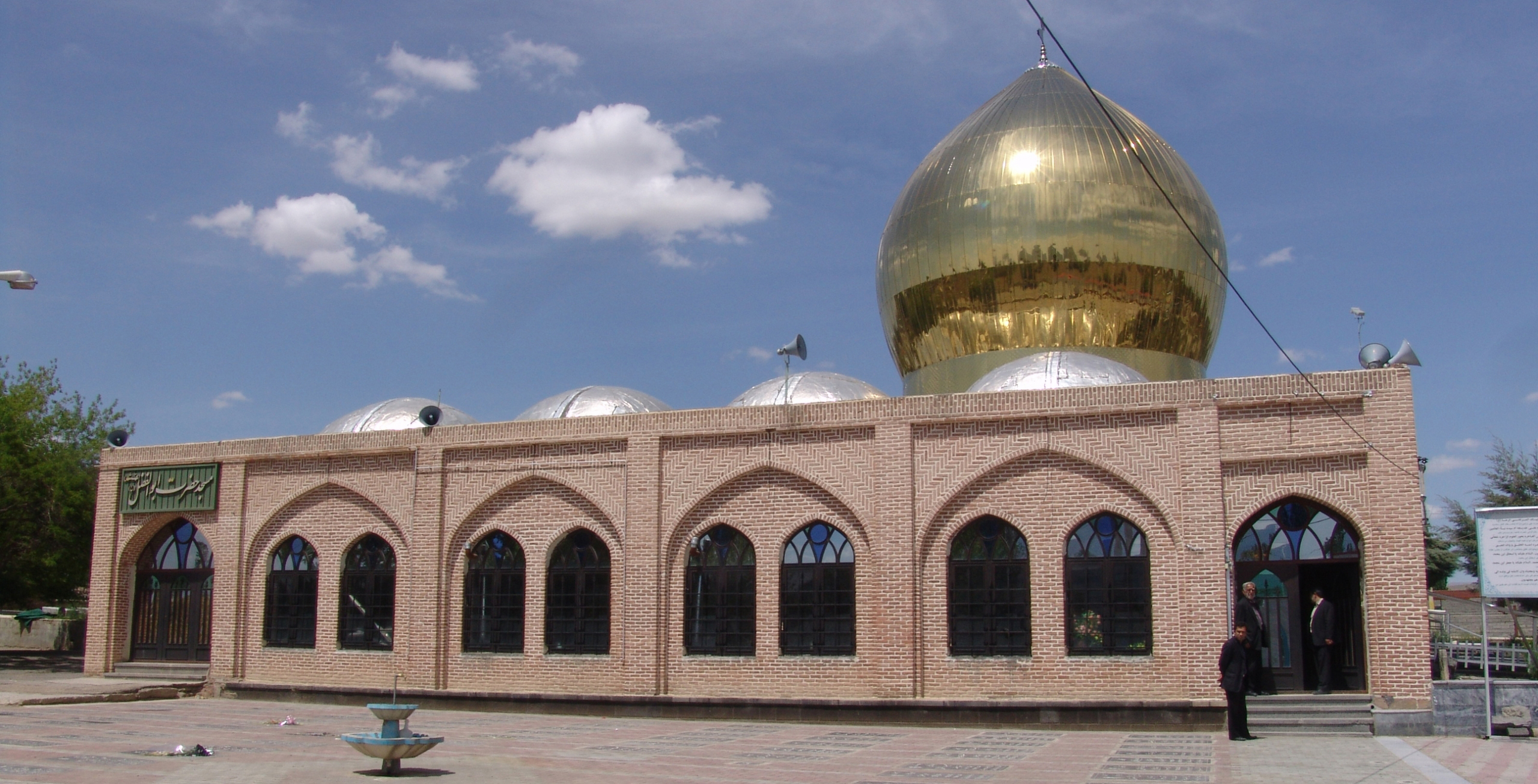
- Emamzadeh Ishaq Mausoleum in Tazeh Shahr

- Location within Iran
- Coordinates: 38°10′33″N 44°41′33″E
- Country: Iran
- Province: West Azerbaijan
- County: Salmas
- District: Central

Population (2016)
  - Total: 8,629
- Time zone: UTC+3:30 (IRST)

Tazeh Shahr (Persian: تازه شهر) (Note: Also romanized as Tāzeh Shahr; formerly Kuhnen Shahr; Azerbaijani: Təzəşəhər; Armenian: Սաղամաս, Քեօհնաշեհիր, or Հին Քաղաք) historically known as Kuhnashahir, is a city in the Central District of Salmas County, West Azerbaijan province, Iran.

== Demographics ==
=== Ethnicity ===
The city is populated by ethnic Azerbaijanis who follow Shia Islam.

=== Population ===
At the time of the 2006 National Census, the city's population was 8,216 in 1,783 households. The following census in 2011 counted 8,864 people in 2,255 households. The 2016 census measured the population of the city as 8,629 people in 2,385 households.

The city sustained damage in the 1930 Salmas earthquake.
