= Gulan-e Sofla =

Gulan-e Sofla گولان سفلي
- Village
- Location within Iran
- Coordinates: 36°07′56″N 45°26′28″E
- Country: Iran
- Province: West Azerbaijan
- County: Sardasht
- Bakhsh: Central
- Rural District: Baryaji

Population (2006)
  - Total: 98
- Time zone: UTC+3:30 (IRST)
  - Summer (DST): UTC+4:30 (IRDT)

Gulan-e Sofla (Persian: گولان سفلي, also Romanized as Gūlān-e Soflá; also known as Gūlān-e Pā'īn) is a village in Baryaji Rural District, in the Central District of Sardasht County, West Azerbaijan Province, Iran. At the 2006 census, its population was 98, in 23 families.
