= Yushanlu, Hamadan =

Yushanlu يوشانلو
- Village
- Country: Iran
- Province: Hamadan
- County: Razan
- Bakhsh: Central
- Rural District: Razan

Population (2006)
  - Total: 376
- Time zone: UTC+3:30 (IRST)
  - Summer (DST): UTC+4:30 (IRDT)

Yushanlu (Persian: يوشانلو, also Romanized as Yūshānlū) is a village in Razan Rural District, in the Central District of Razan County, Hamadan Province, Iran. At the 2006 census, its population was 376, in 99 families.
