= Zaviyeh Jik =

Village in West Azerbaijan province, Iran

Zaviyeh Jik Persian: زاويه جيک
- Village
- Location within Iran
- Coordinates: 38°06′50″N 44°45′53″E
- Country: Iran
- Province: West Azerbaijan
- County: Salmas
- District: Central
- Rural District: Zulachay

Population (2016)
  - Total: 1,401
- Time zone: UTC+3:30 (IRST)

Zaviyeh Jik (Persian: زاويه جيک) (Note: Also romanized as Zāvīyeh Jīk and Zāvyeh Jīk; formerly known as Ziveh Jik (زيوه جيك), also romanized as Zīveh Jīk; also known as Zewajik; in Armenian: Զևաջուկ or Զեյվաջուկ) is a village in Zulachay Rural District of the Central District in Salmas County, West Azerbaijan province, Iran.

== Demographics ==
=== Population ===
At the time of the 2006 National Census, the village's population, as Ziveh Jik, was 1,245 in 226 households. The following census in 2011 counted 1,415 people in 321 households, by which time the village was listed as Zaviyeh Jik. The 2016 census measured the population of the village as 1,401 people in 316 households.
