= Chobanlu =

- Location within Armenia Location within Syunik Province
- Coordinates: 39°16′N 46°22′E
- Country: Armenia
- Marz (Province): Syunik
- Time zone: UTC+4 ( )

Chobanlu is an abandoned village in the Syunik Province of Armenia.
