= Salmas =

City in West Azerbaijan province, Iran

Salmas سلماس
- City
- Salmas
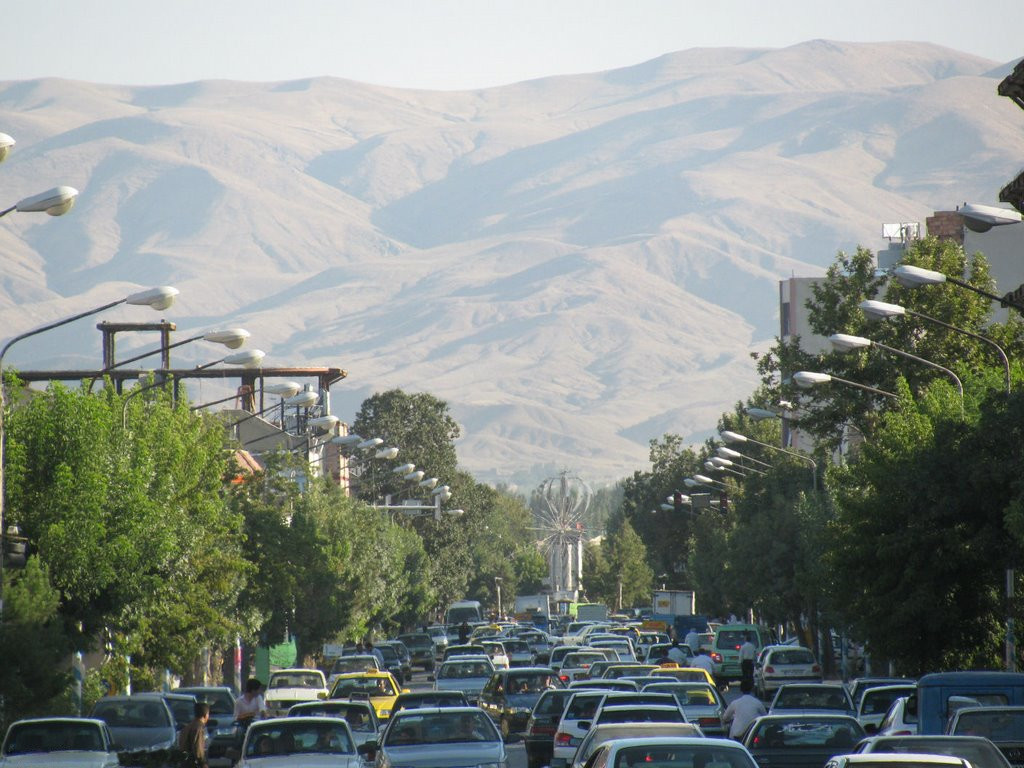

- Location within Iran
- Coordinates: 38°12′10″N 44°46′01″E
- Country: Iran
- Province: West Azerbaijan
- County: Salmas
- District: Central
- Earliest Recognition: 224–242 AD
- Rebuilt: 1930

Government
  - Type: Mayor–Council
  - Body: Salmas
  - Mayor: N/A

Area
  - Total: 9.26 sq mi (24.0 km^{2})
  - Land: 9.26 sq mi (24.0 km^{2})
  - Water: 0 sq mi (0 km^{2})
  - Metro: 4.75 sq mi (12.3 km^{2})
- Elevation: 4,531 ft (1,381 m)

Population (2016)
  - Total: 92,811
  - Rank: TBA, Iran
  - Density: 10,000/sq mi (3,870/km^{2})
- Demonym(s): Salmasi, Salmassi
- Time zone: UTC+3:30 (IRST)
- ZIP code: 58811 ≤ 58XXX ≤ 58991
- Area code: 44

Salmas (Persian: سلماس) (Note: Also romanized as Salamas and Salmās; formerly Dīlmagān, Dīlman, Shahpoor, Shāhpūr, and Shapur; also Armenian: Սալմաստ or Դիլման; Azerbaijani: سلماس; Kurdish: سەڵماس; and Syriac: ܣܵܠܵܡܵܣ, romanized as Salamas) is a city in the Central District of Salmas County, West Azerbaijan province, Iran, serving as capital of both the county and the district.

== Etymology ==
The original name of Salmas was Dilman, which is probably related to the Daylamites who sometimes controlled the region. In the 20th century, it was known as Shapur.

== History ==
=== Iron Age ===
Salmas is located in the historic Azerbaijan region. Its archaeological relics, which date as far back as the Urartian kingdom (860–590 BC), attest to its long human habitation.

=== Classical Age ===
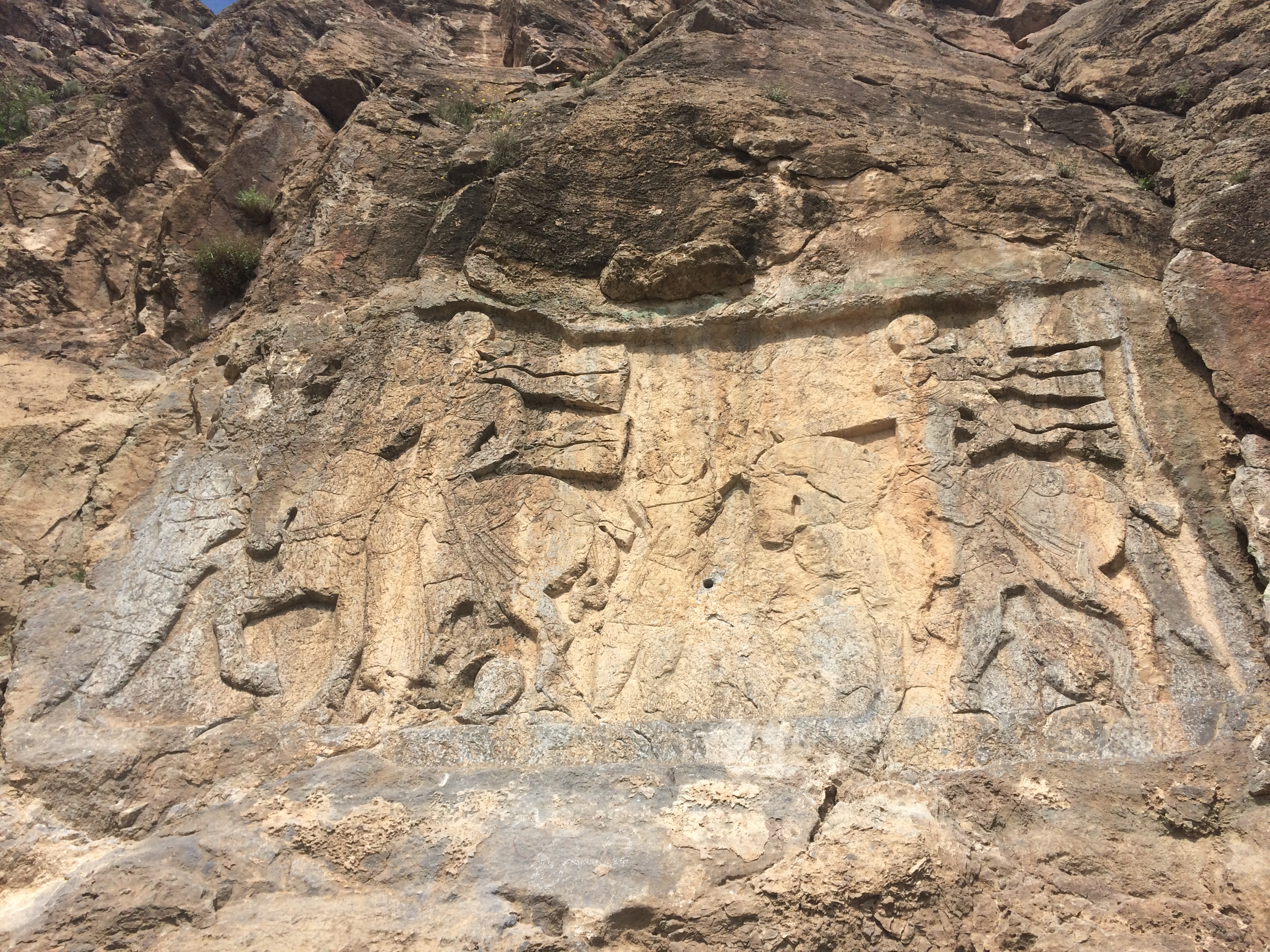
The rock relief in the Khan-Takhti village near Salmas, constructed during the reign of the Sasanian monarch Ardashir I (r. 224–242)

Salmas was part of the Armenian province of Nor Shirakan (also known as Persarmenia), which was inhabited by Armenians. A rock relief erected during the reign of the Sasanian monarch Ardashir I (r. 224–242) is located in the Khan-Takhti village near Salmas. This rock relief illustrates two akin scenarios in which a standing man receives a ring from a man riding a horse.

The standing men's names are subject to interpretation, but the horsemen are typically considered to be Ardashir I and his son and heir, Shapur I. The German orientalist Ferdinand Justi (died 1907) theorized that the relief is meant to show the Armenians' gratitude to Ardashir I and Shapur I, something which some later scholars supported. The Iranologist Ehsan Shavarebi considers this theory to be "logical" but stresses that "we need more investigations on the event depicted on the relief." He suggests that the rock relief is meant to illustrate the probable peace made between Ardashir I and the Kingdom of Armenia. When the Arsacid house of Armenia was abolished and the country was made a Sasanian province in 428, Nor Shirakan and Paytakaran were incorporated into the Sasanian province of Adurbadagan.

Two archeological sites showing inhabitation during the Sasanian era has been found near Salmas. One of them is known as Haftan Tepe, which contains Sasanian-era pottery akin to those found in Takht-e Soleyman. The other is called Qazun Basi, located to the south of Salmas. They were likely used as military and administrative hubs. The 9th-century Muslim historian al-Baladhuri reported that the taxes of Salmas had been long given to Mosul, suggesting that during the Arab conquest of Iran it was Arab armies from Diyar Rabi'a that conquered Salmas. During the reign of Marzuban ibn Muhammad (r. 941/42–957) of the Daylamite Sallarid dynasty, Salmas became subjugated to his rule. In 943/44, Marzuban ibn Muhammad repelled an attack on Salmas by the Hamdanid dynasty, and in 955/56, it was attacked by the Kurdish military leader Daysam. By 975, Salmas was seemingly under the rule of the Kurdish Rawadid dynasty, who after 983/84 ruled all of Azerbaijan.

Salmas is described by the 10th-century Islamic geographers Ibn Hawkal and al-Istakhri as a tiny town in Azerbaijan with a sturdy wall in a fertile location. Another 10th-century Islamic geographer, al-Maqdisi, considers the town to have been part of the administration of Armenia and inhabited by Kurds, which according to the modern scholar and orientalist Clifford Edmund Bosworth must had been part of the Hadhabani tribe. In 1054/55, the Seljuk Empire imposed their rule on the Rawwadids, and in 1070 removed them from power resulting in Salmas being captured by the Seljuks. In 1064, the Seljuk sultan Alp Arslan (r. 1063–1072) made a military campaign against the Byzantines, Armenians and Georgians, in which the Kurds of Salmas took part.

Salmas was in ruins during the lifetime of the Muslim scholar Yaqut al-Hamawi (died 1229), but according to the geographer Hamdallah Mustawfi (died after 1339/40), it was once again thriving in the middle of the 14th-century. The vizier Khwaja Taj al-Din Ali Shah Tabrizi had rebuilt the town's 8,000-step-long wall during the reign of Ilkhanate ruler Ghazan (r. 1295–1304), and Salmas's revenues—presumably those of the entire district—amounted to 39,000 dinars, a large amount.

Another mention of the city was made in 1281, when its bishop made the trip to the consecration of the Church of the East patriarch Yaballaha in Baghdad.

In the Battle of Salmas on 17–18 September 1429, the Kara Koyunlu were defeated by Shah Rukh who was consolidating Timurid holdings west of Lake Urmia. However, the area was retaken by the Kara Koyunlu in 1447 after the death of Shah Rukh.

The Lak tribe settled in the Salmas area at the end of the 16th century. It seems that at the time, the governor of Lak and Salmas was interchangeable. Today, there remains a possible final trace of the tribe in the form of a Lakestan area of the tribe which post-Safavids lived dispersed across the country.

In March 1915 Cevdet Bey ordered 800 Assyrians of Salmas to be killed. Mar Shimun, the Patriarch of the Church of the East was murdered by the Kurdish chieftain Simko Shikak in Salmas in March 1918.

Around the advent of the 1910s, Imperial Russia started to station infantry and Cossacks in Salmas. The Russians retreated at the time of Enver Pasha's offensive in the Iran-Caucasus region, but returned in early 1916, and stayed up to the wake of the Russian Revolution.

== Demographics ==
=== Language and ethnicity ===
The majority of the population is composed of Azerbaijanis and Kurds with some Armenians, Assyrians, and Jews.

=== Population ===
At the time of the 2006 National Census, the city's population was 79,560 in 19,806 households. The following census in 2011 counted 88,196 people in 23,751 households. The 2016 census measured the population of the city as 92,811 people in 27,115 households. According to the 2019 census, the city's population is 127,864.

== Geography ==
=== Climate ===
Under the Köppen climate classification, Salmas features a cold semi-arid climate (BSk), typical of northwestern Iran.

Climate data for Salmas (2001-2010 normals)
Month	Jan	Feb	Mar	Apr	May	Jun	Jul	Aug	Sep	Oct	Nov	Dec	Year
Mean daily maximum °C (°F)	2.0 (35.6)	5.6 (42.1)	12.1 (53.8)	16.6 (61.9)	22.0 (71.6)	28.2 (82.8)	31.3 (88.3)	31.5 (88.7)	26.9 (80.4)	20.6 (69.1)	11.5 (52.7)	4.8 (40.6)	17.8 (64.0)
Daily mean °C (°F)	−2.7 (27.1)	0.5 (32.9)	6.2 (43.2)	10.7 (51.3)	15.3 (59.5)	20.6 (69.1)	24.0 (75.2)	24.0 (75.2)	19.3 (66.7)	13.8 (56.8)	5.9 (42.6)	−0.1 (31.8)	11.5 (52.6)
Mean daily minimum °C (°F)	−7.5 (18.5)	−4.6 (23.7)	0.3 (32.5)	4.8 (40.6)	8.5 (47.3)	13.1 (55.6)	16.7 (62.1)	16.5 (61.7)	11.7 (53.1)	7.0 (44.6)	0.3 (32.5)	−5.0 (23.0)	5.1 (41.3)
Average precipitation mm (inches)	10.3 (0.41)	16.8 (0.66)	29.9 (1.18)	43.9 (1.73)	46.0 (1.81)	20.7 (0.81)	8.0 (0.31)	8.1 (0.32)	9.9 (0.39)	22.6 (0.89)	21.5 (0.85)	9.8 (0.39)	247.5 (9.75)
Average relative humidity (%)	76	69	58	56	58	45	43	40	42	52	68	76	57
Average dew point °C (°F)	−5.8 (21.6)	−5.0 (23.0)	−2.6 (27.3)	1.5 (34.7)	6.2 (43.2)	8.0 (46.4)	10.9 (51.6)	10.1 (50.2)	5.8 (42.4)	3.7 (38.7)	0.0 (32.0)	−4.8 (23.4)	2.3 (36.2)
Mean monthly sunshine hours	139.0	168.4	214.7	214.0	245.3	347.4	354.4	348.4	305.8	240.0	174.3	137.8	2,889.5
Source: Iran Meteorological Organization(temperatures), (precipitaion), (humidity, dew point and sun 2001-2005)

Salmas Historical Population
Year	Population	±%
1930	~8000	—
1934	~7000	—
1956	13,161	—
1966	21,703	+64.9%
1976	27,638	+27.3%
1986	50,573	+83.0%
1996	65,416	+29.3%
2006	89,617	+37.0%
2011	97,060	+8.3%
2016	101,441	+4.5%
2021	N/A	—
Note: The data presented of 1976 and earlier (1956–1976) are from the censuses before Iranian Revolution and the data of 1986 and later (1986–2016) are from the censuses after it. The data for the years 1920 and 1924 are not of any censuses. Sources: "Population and Housing Census". Statistical Center of Iran. (used for censuses of 2006 and later), "An Analysis to the Urban System of West Azerbaijan Province During the Years 1956 till 2006". Urban Ecology Researches. (used for censuses of 1996 and earlier; the amounts are obtained from the data given in "Real Population" columns!), "Location and Geography of the City". Salmas County Municipality. (used for data of the years 1920 and 1924)

== Notable people ==
- Stepanos V of Salmast (d. 1567) – Catholicos of the Armenian Apostolic Church
- Yohannan Gabriel (1758–1833) – Chaldean Catholic bishop of Salmas
- Nicholas I Zaya (d. 1855) – Patriarch of Babylon of the Chaldeans
- Raffi (1835–1888) – Armenian novelist
- Paul Bedjan (1838–1920) – Chaldean Catholic priest and orientalist
- Abraham Guloyan (1893–1983) – Politician
- Murad Kostanyan (1902–1989) – Actor
- Hossein Sadaghiani (1903–1982) – The first manager and head coach of Iran national football team (1941–1951) and the first Iranian soccer player to play for foreign clubs (R. Charleroi S.C. and Fenerbahce SK) and in a European league
- Ardeshir Ovanessian (c. 1905–1990) – Communist leader
- Timur Lakestani (1915–2011) – aka Father of Iranian Electrical Industry
- Jafar Salmasi (1918–2000) – weightlifter
- Emmanuel Agassi (1930–2021) – boxer and father of Andre Agassi
- Hadi Asghari (b. 1981) – football player

== Gallery ==
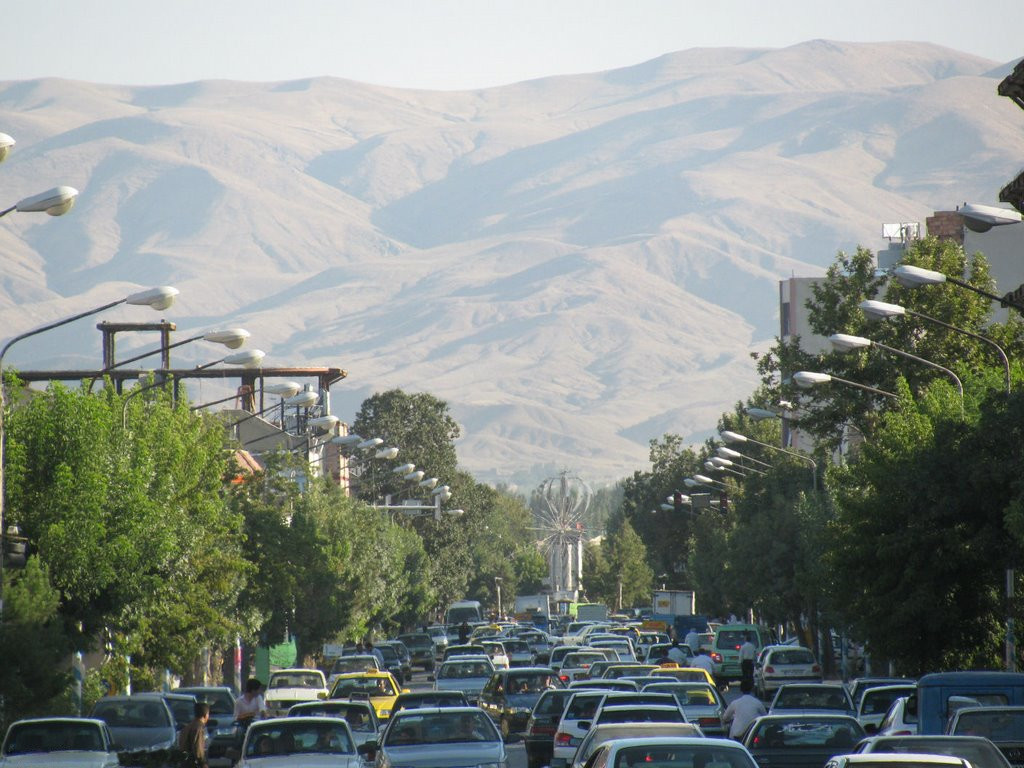
Overall View of Imam St. and Shahrdari Sq.

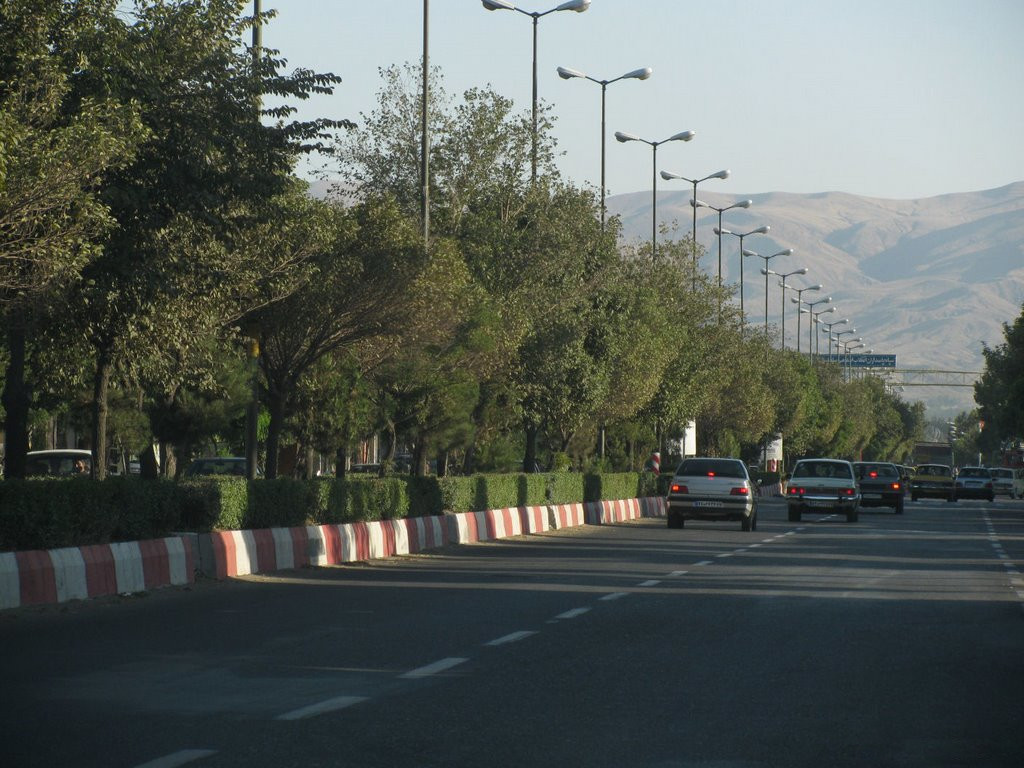
Islamic Republic Blvd., Near Panahi Technical School

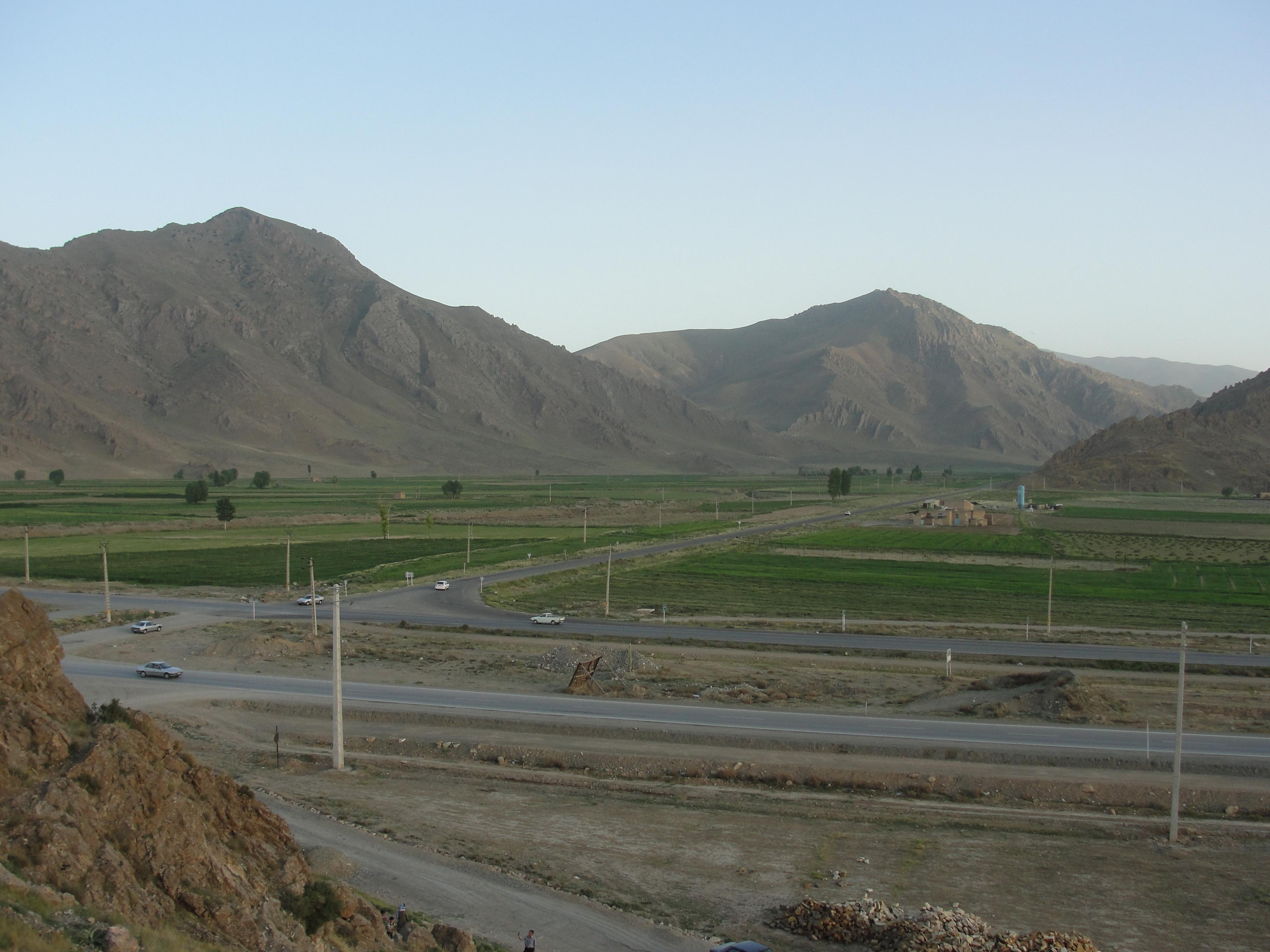
Khan Takhti-Rd near Salmas

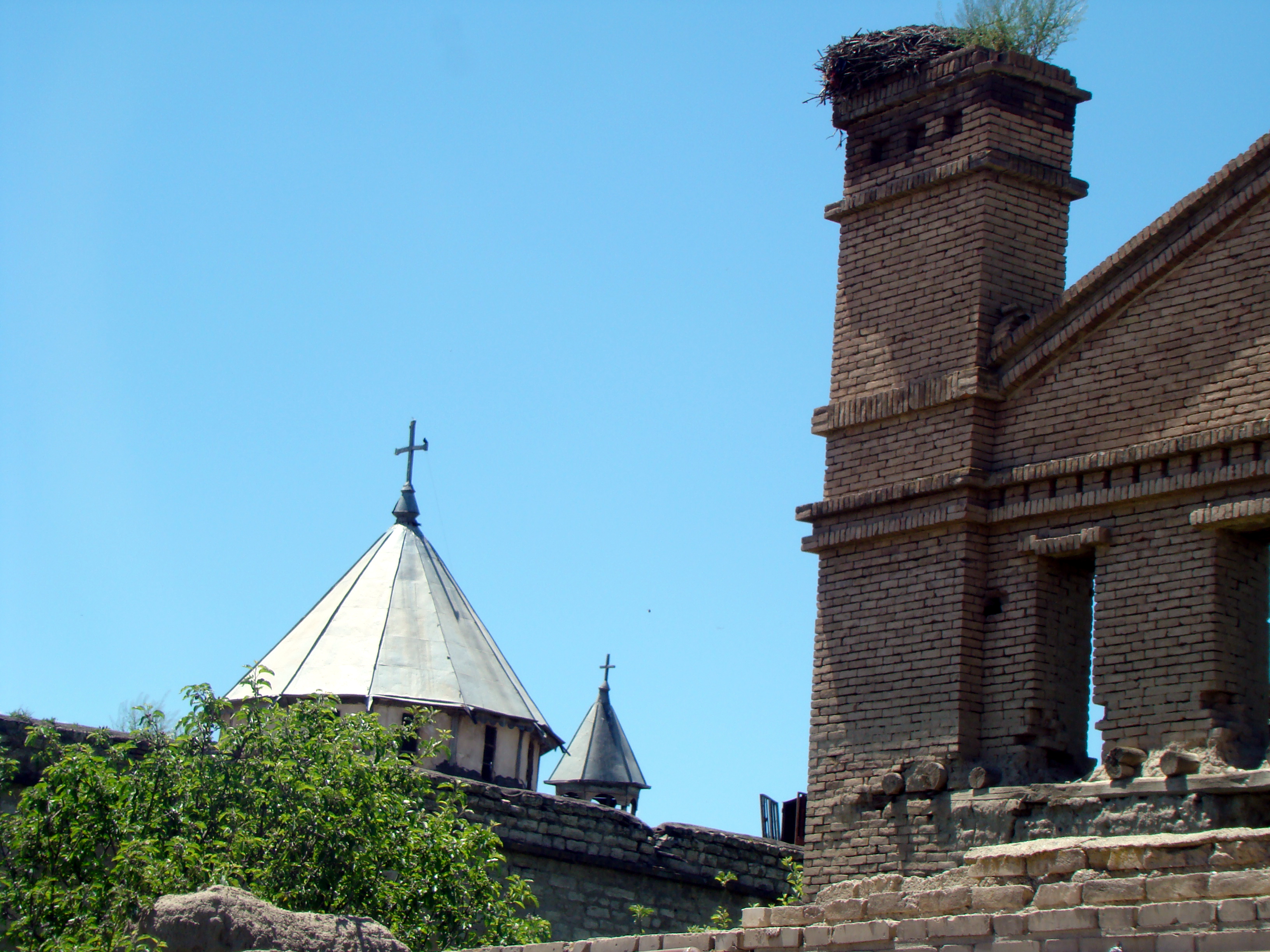
The Haftvan Church

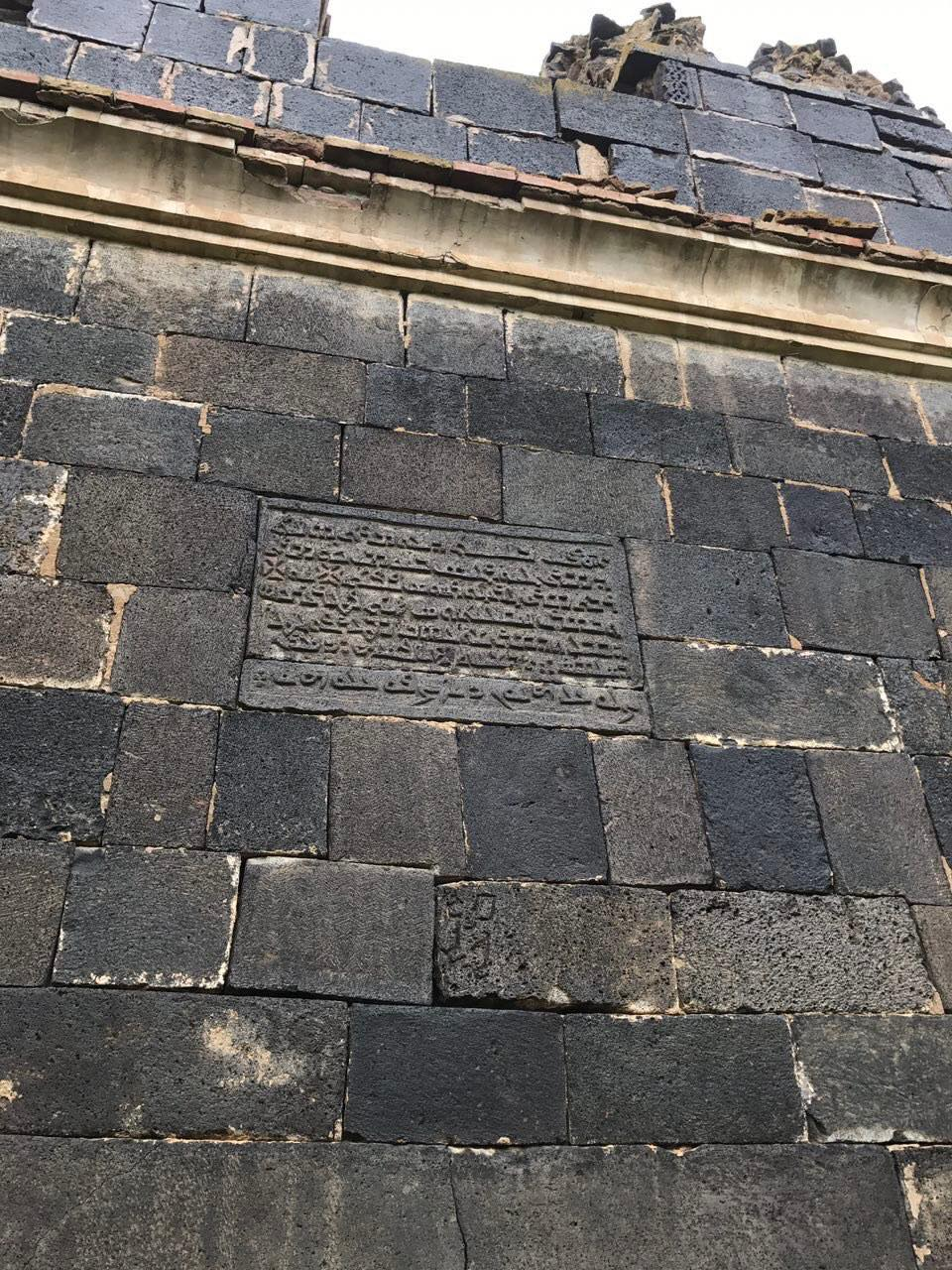
Chaldean Catholic Church in Salmas

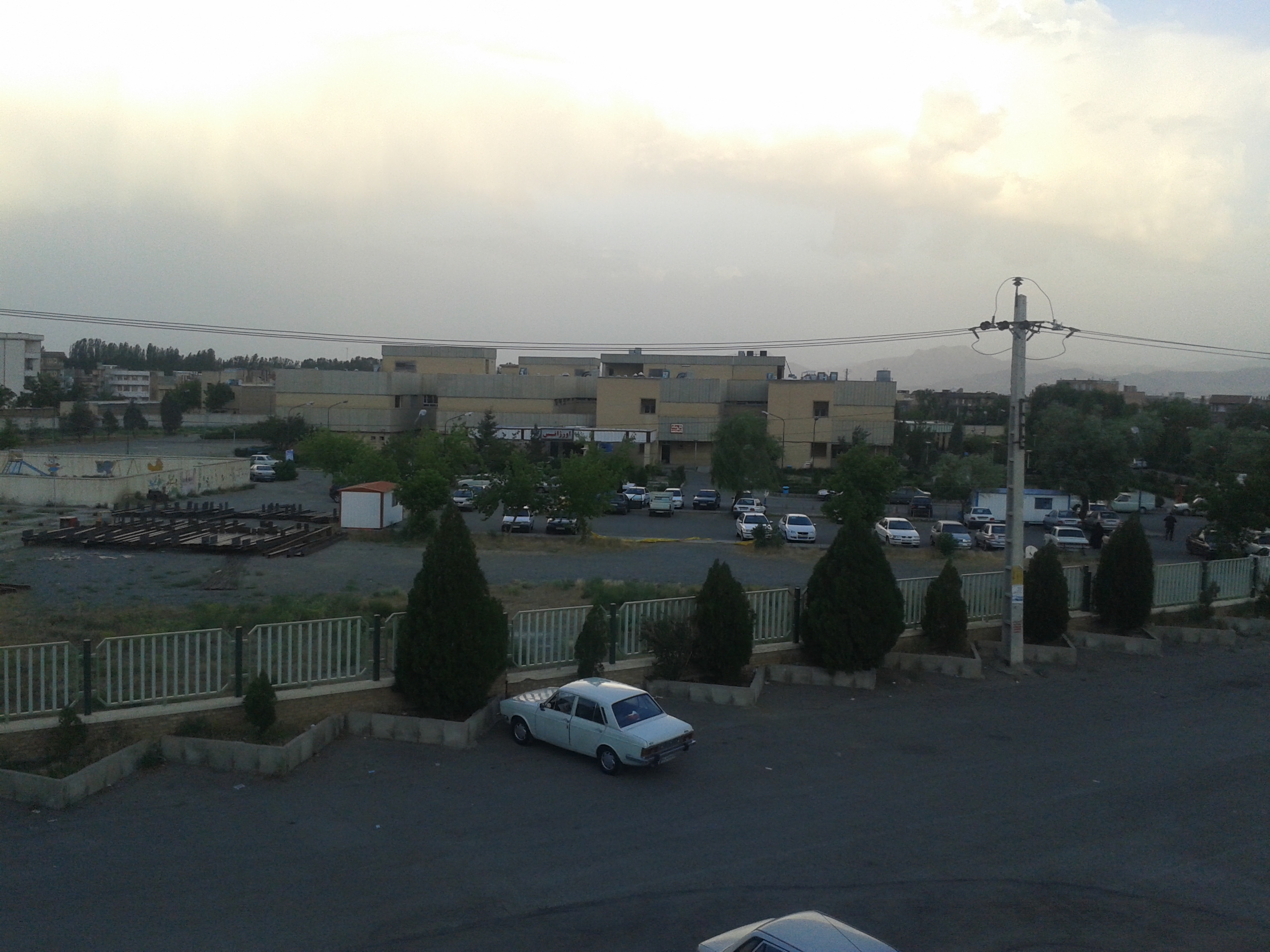

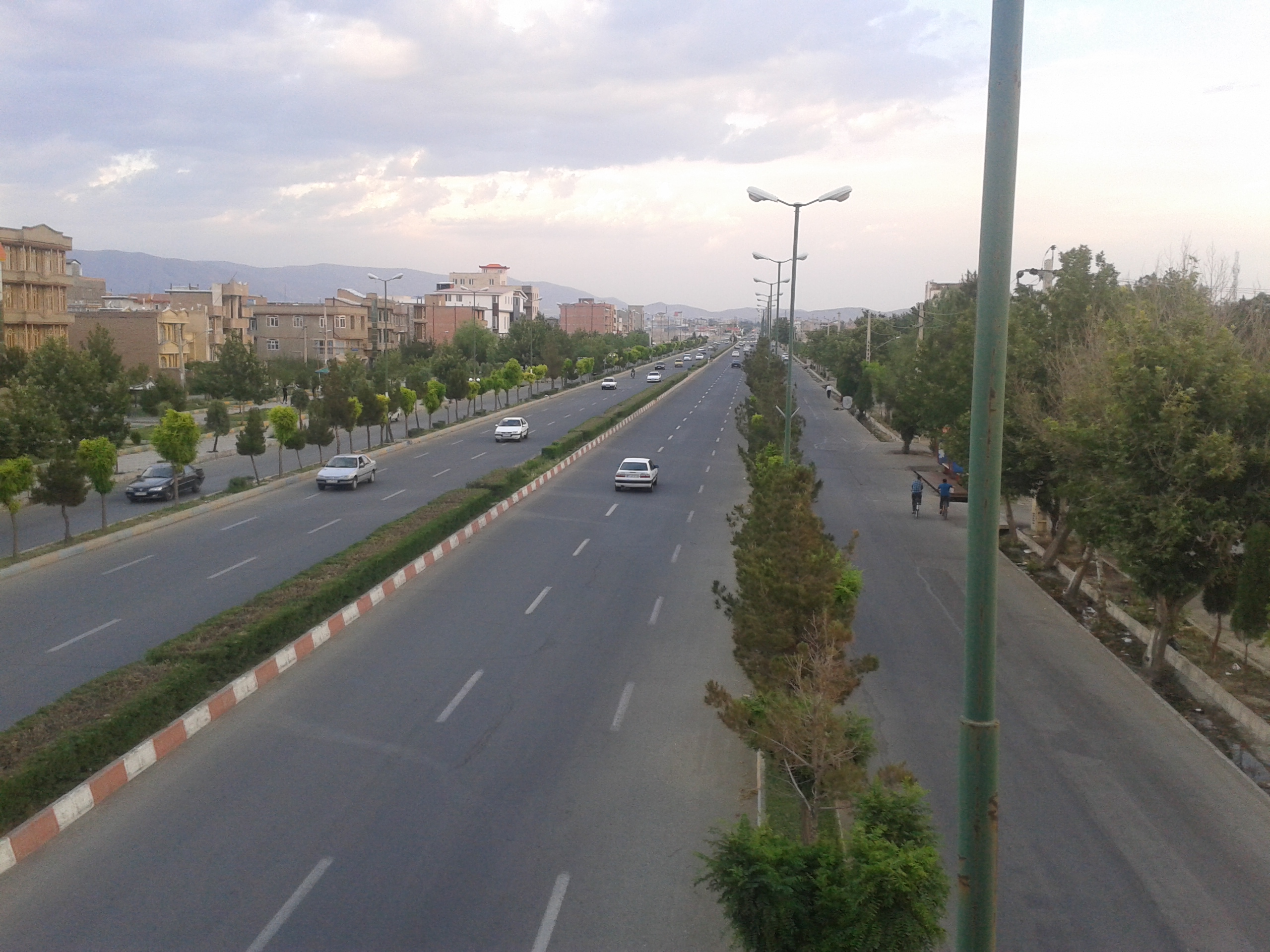
Salmas

An angled front view of Salmas Imam Khomeini Prayer House, 2017

A view of Nation Park in a Winter night, 2016

== See also ==
- 1930 Salmas earthquake
- Nor Shirakan
- Battle of Dilman
- Assyrian homeland
- Khoy Khanate

Media related to Salmas at Wikimedia Commons

== Sources ==
- Atabaki, Touraj (2006). Iran and the First World War: Battleground of the Great Powers. I.B.Tauris. ISBN 978-1860649646.
- Bosworth, C.E. (1995). "Salmās". In Bosworth, C. E.; van Donzel, E.; Heinrichs, W. P. & Lecomte, G. (eds.). The Encyclopaedia of Islam, Second Edition. Volume VIII: Ned–Sam. Leiden: E. J. Brill. ISBN 978-90-04-09834-3.
- Ghodrat-Dizaji, Mehrdad (2007). "Administrative Geography of the Early Sasanian Period: The Case of Ādurbādagān". Iran: Journal of the British Institute of Persian Studies. 45 (1): 87–93. doi:10.1080/05786967.2007.11864720. S2CID 133088896.
- Ghodrat-Dizaji, Mehrdad (2010). "Ādurbādagān during the Late Sasanian Period: A Study in Administrative Geography". Iran: Journal of the British Institute of Persian Studies. 48 (1): 69–80. doi:10.1080/05786967.2010.11864774. S2CID 163839498.
- Peacock, Andrew (2017). "Rawwadids". Encyclopædia Iranica, online edition. New York.
- Shahinyan, Arsen (2016). "Northern Territories of the Sasanian Atropatene and the Arab Azerbaijan". Iran and the Caucasus. 20 (2): 191–203. doi:10.1163/1573384X-20160203.
- Shavarebi, Ehsan (2014). "A Reinterpretation of the Sasanian Relief at Salmās". Iran and the Caucasus. 18 (2). Brill: 115–133. doi:10.1163/1573384X-20140203.
