= Jalpot =

- Village
- Location in Punjab, India Jalpot (India)
- Coordinates: 31.3881306°N 75.7554213°E
- Country: India
- State: Punjab
- District: Jalandhar

Government
  - Type: Panchayat raj
  - Body: Gram panchayat
- Elevation: 240 m (790 ft)

Languages
  - Official: Punjabi
- Time zone: UTC+5:30 (IST)
- ISO 3166 code: IN-PB
- Website: jalandhar.nic.in

Jalpot is a village in Jalandhar district of Punjab State, India. It is located 30 kilometres (19 mi) from district headquarter Jalandhar and 150 kilometres (93 mi) from state capital Chandigarh. The village is administrated by a sarpanch who is an elected representative of village as per Panchayati raj (India).

== See also ==
- List of villages in India
