= Ostureh =

Ostureh استوره
- Village
- Location within Iran
- Coordinates: 38°03′53″N 44°26′48″E
- Country: Iran
- Province: West Azerbaijan
- County: Salmas
- Bakhsh: Kuhsar
- Rural District: Shepiran

Population (2006)
  - Total: 583
- Time zone: UTC+3:30 (IRST)
  - Summer (DST): UTC+4:30 (IRDT)

Ostureh (Persian: استوره, also Romanized as Ostūreh or Satura) is a village in Shepiran Rural District, Kuhsar District, Salmas County, West Azerbaijan Province, Iran. At the 2006 census, its population was 583, in 84 families.
