= Zulachay Rural District =

Rural district in West Azerbaijan province, Iran

Zulachay Rural District Persian: دهستان زولاچائ
- Rural District
- Location within Iran
- Coordinates: 38°08′N 44°45′E
- Country: Iran
- Province: West Azerbaijan
- County: Salmas
- District: Central
- Established: 1987
- Capital: Malham

Population (2016)
  - Total: 29,524
- Time zone: UTC+3:30 (IRST)

Zulachay Rural District (Persian: دهستان زولاچائ) is in the Central District of Salmas County, West Azerbaijan province, Iran. Its capital is the village of Malham.

== Demographics ==
=== Population ===
At the time of the 2006 National Census, the rural district's population was 24,868 in 5,417 households. There were 29,037 inhabitants in 7,349 households at the following census of 2011. The 2016 census measured the population of the rural district as 29,524 in 7,881 households. The most populous of its 40 villages was Haftevan, with 8,203 people.

=== Other villages in the rural district ===
- Gavlan
- Kalashan
- Moghanjuq
- Patah Vir
- Sarnaq
- Sureh
- Zaviyeh Jik
