= Lakestan Rural District =

Rural district in West Azerbaijan province, Iran

Lakestan Rural District Persian: نام قوم ایرانی لكستان
- Rural District
- Location within Iran
- Coordinates: 38°14′N 44°58′E
- Country: Iran
- Province: West Azerbaijan
- County: Salmas
- District: Central
- Established: 1987
- Capital: Qarah Qeshlaq

Population (2016)
  - Total: 10,387
- Time zone: UTC+3:30 (IRST)

Lakestan Rural District (Persian: دهستان لكستان) is in the Central District of Salmas County, West Azerbaijan province, Iran. Its capital is the village of Qarah Qeshlaq. The previous capital of the rural district was the village of Soltan Ahmad.

== Etymology ==
Willem M Floor suggested that the name of the Lakestan Rural District was possibly the last trace of the historic Lak tribe, who were of southern Kurdish origin but present around Salmas during the Safavid era. Military geographer Hossein-Ali Razmara wrote that Lakestan was named after Lak refugees from the Caucasus who settled there. Ali-Akbar Dehkhoda also believed it was named after the Caucasian Laks. Mohammad-Amin Riahi believed it was named after the Kurdish Laks who disappeared during the Safavid period, and claimed that there was insufficient evidence that it was named after Caucasian immigrants.

== Demographics ==
=== Population ===
At the time of the 2006 National Census, the rural district's population was 11,486 in 2,773 households. There were 11,589 inhabitants in 3,195 households at the following census of 2011. The 2016 census measured the population of the rural district as 10,387 in 3,083 households. The most populous of its 28 villages was Qarah Qeshlaq, with 2,040 people.

=== Other villages in the rural district ===
- Akhteh Khaneh
- Bargoshad
- Hamzeh Kandi
- Kangarlu
- Sadaqian
- Yalquz Aghaj
