= Koreh Soni Rural District =

Rural district in West Azerbaijan province, Iran

Koreh Soni Rural District Persian: دهستان كره سني
- Rural District
- Location within Iran
- Coordinates: 38°17′N 44°45′E
- Country: Iran
- Province: West Azerbaijan
- County: Salmas
- District: Central
- Established: 1987
- Capital: Silab

Population (2016)
  - Total: 22,234
- Time zone: UTC+3:30 (IRST)

Koreh Soni Rural District (Persian: دهستان كره سني) is in the Central District of Salmas County, West Azerbaijan province, Iran. Its capital is the village of Silab.

== Demographics ==
=== Population ===
At the time of the 2006 National Census, the rural district's population was 19,951 in 3,892 households. There were 22,300 inhabitants in 5,463 households at the following census of 2011. The 2016 census measured the population of the rural district as 22,234 in 5,713 households. The most populous of its 26 villages was Silab, with 4,505 people.

=== Other villages in the rural district ===
- Hadar
- Kanian
- Saray-e Malek
- Shekar Yazi
- Shurik
- Ureban
- Vardan
