= Central District (Salmas County) =

District in West Azerbaijan province, Iran

Central District (Salmas County) Persian: بخش مرکزی شهرستان سلماس
- District
- Location within Iran
- Coordinates: 38°11′N 44°49′E
- Country: Iran
- Province: West Azerbaijan
- County: Salmas
- Capital: Salmas

Population (2016)
  - Total: 168,630
- Time zone: UTC+3:30 (IRST)

The Central District of Salmas County (Persian: بخش مرکزی شهرستان سلماس) is in West Azerbaijan province, Iran. Its capital is the city of Salmas.

== Demographics ==
=== Population ===
At the time of the 2006 National Census, the district's population was 150,256 in 34,974 households. The following census in 2011 counted 165,639 people in 43,485 households. The 2016 census measured the population of the district as 168,630 inhabitants in 47,608 households.

=== Administrative divisions ===
Central District (Salmas County) Population
Administrative Divisions	2006	2011	2016
Kenarporuzh RD	6,175	5,653	5,045
Koreh Soni RD	19,951	22,300	22,234
Lakestan RD	11,486	11,589	10,387
Zulachay RD	24,868	29,037	29,524
Salmas (city)	79,560	88,196	92,811
Tazeh Shahr (city)	8,216	8,864	8,629
Total	150,256	165,639	168,630
RD = Rural District
