= List of Armenian merchants =

This is a list of famous Armenian merchants.

== Individuals ==
=== Early modern period ===
- Tigran Honents
- Hovhannes Jughayetsi
- Sikandar Mirza
- Khwaja Safar
- Petik and Sanos
- Anton Çelebi
- Hasan Agha
- Abro Chelebi
- Zakaria Aguletsi
- Hajji Piri
- Marcara Avanchintz
- Abgar Ali Akbar Armani
- Hagopdjan de Deritchan
- Khoja Wajid
- Khoja Gregory
- Coja Petrus Uscan
- Shahamir Shahamirian
- Ivan Lazarevich Lazarev
- Harutiun Bezjian
- Boghos Bey Yusufian

=== Late modern period ===
- George Manook
- Manuc Bei
- Nicholas Pogose
- Calouste Gulbenkian
- Arshag Karagheusian
- Aris Alexanian, rug merchant in Hamilton, Ontario
- Arthur T. Gregorian, rug merchant in Massachusetts

== Merchant families ==
- Family of Khoja Nazar and Khoja Safraz (Nazar's son)
- Apcar family
- Sceriman family
- Lazarian family (ru)
- Sarkies Brothers
