= Mirza Zulqarnain =

Official and poet in the Mughal court (c. 1594 – c. 1656)

- Born: c. 1594
- Died: c. 1656 (aged 61–62)
- Occupation: Official of the Mughal court
- Known for: Poetry and songs
- Spouse: Helen
- Parent(s): Sikandar Mirza (died 1613) & Lady Juliana (died 1598)

Mirza Zulqarnain or Mirza Zul-Qarnain (c. 1594 – c. 1656) was a diwan and faujdar of Armenian descent in the court of the Mughal Empire.

He was brought up in the royal harem and, after being appointed to official posts, spent most of his career in Sambhar where he administered the lucrative salt pans there. He also served as governor in other parts of the empire. He was a noted poet and composer of Urdu songs.

== Early life and family ==
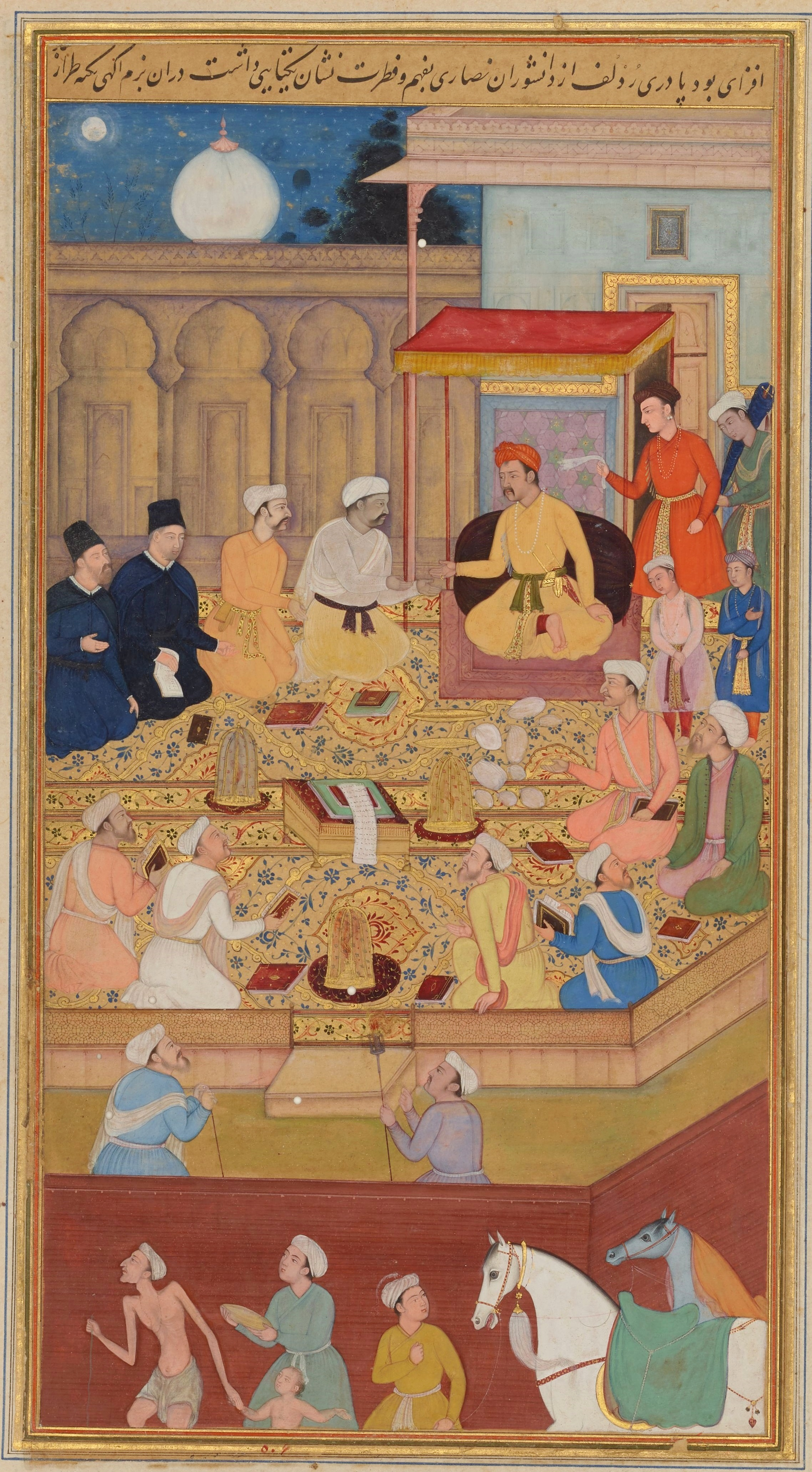
Akbar receiving the Jesuit missionaries (in black) Rodolfo Acquaviva and Francisco Henriques at the Ibadat Khana (House of Worship) in Fatehpur Sikri. Miniature by Nar Singh from the Akbarnama, c. 1592–94.

Mirza Zulqarnain was born around 1594, (Note: He was about 19 at the time of his father's death in 1613 according to Husain. Born 1592 according to Seth.) the elder son of Sikandar Mirza (or Iskander/Alexander Mirza) (died 1613), an Armenian merchant who travelled from Aleppo to Lahore during the reign of Akbar and joined his court. His mother, Lady Juliana (died 1598), (Note: Not to be confused with Lady Juliana of Agra) was a doctor in Akbar's seraglio and the daughter of the Armenian chief justice Abdul Hai. She was given to Sikandar by Akbar.

He was originally named Alexander but given the name Mirza Zul-Qarnain by Akbar, Zul-Qarnain meaning "the two-horned" like Alexander the Great. Zulqarnain was brought up in the royal harem with one of his brothers until the age of 12 and thus got to know the royal children of the court including Prince Khurram and Shah Jahan.

Around 1590, he married Helen, for which a special dispensation was obtained from the Pope. They had three sons and a daughter. She died in 1638 and was buried in a mausoleum in her garden in Lahore.

== Career ==
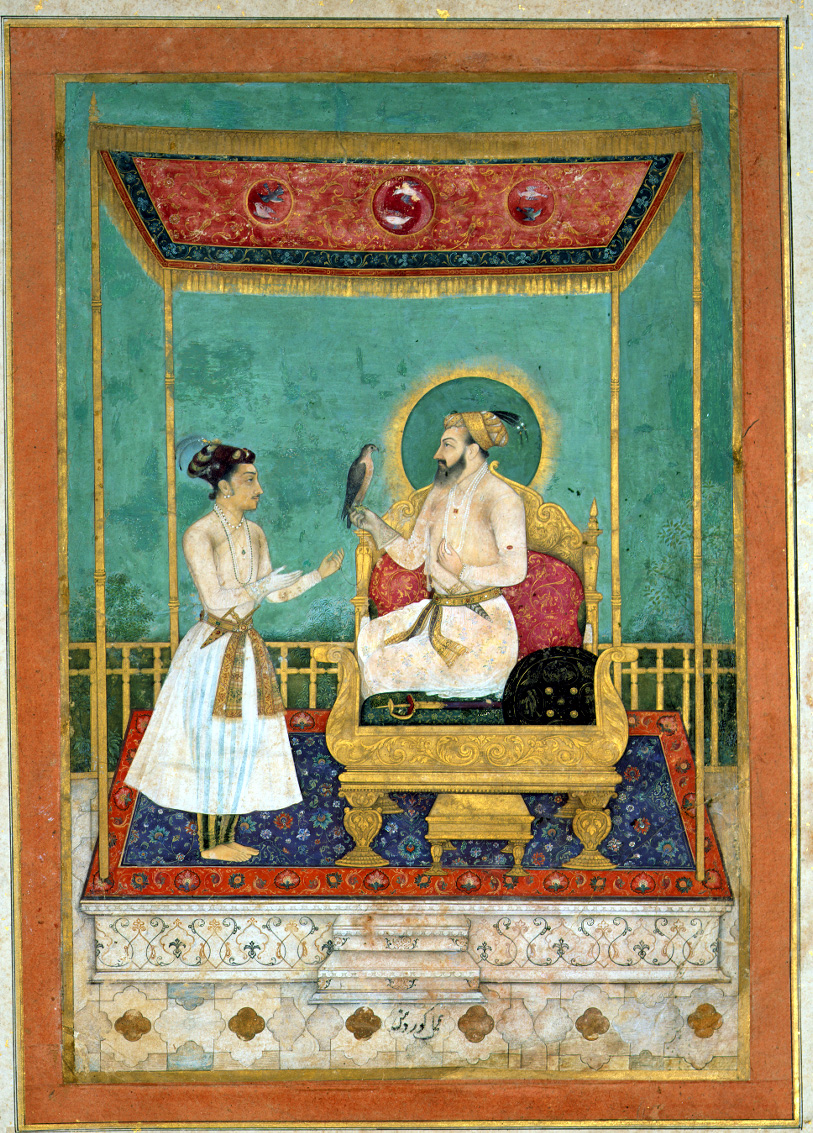
Shah Jahan Accepts a Falcon From Dara Shikoh. c.1630.

Zulqarnain spent most of his career in Sambhar where he was a diwan of the salt pans, a prestigious and lucrative post involving financial administration that had also been held by his father. He was also faujdar (provincial administrator or governor) there and faujdar of Bahraich from 1629 to 1633. In 1632 he presented five elephants to the Mughal Court as nazr. He then briefly served as the kiladar of Bharuch.

From 1642 to around 1648 he was serving with Shah Shuja in Bengal below the rank of subedar or hakim before returning as faujdar of Sambhar in 1649. He was a mansabdar and held the rank of panjsadi seh sad sawar on three occasions. He retired to Delhi on a pension of 100 rupees per day in 1654.

== Writing ==
He was an accomplished poet, as attested by the Padshahnama, and was praised by Emperor Jahangir as a composer of Hindustani songs. He presented his poems at the court of Shah Jahan on special occasions such as the shah's accession and before Shahjahanabad (Old Delhi) was created capital of the empire.

== Christianity ==
Although Jahangir had Zulqarnain and his brother forcibly converted to Islam upon succeeding to the throne, this appears to have been purely formal, as Zulqarnain lived his life as a Catholic. The 17th-century merchant Peter Mundy referred to Zulqarnain as the "chiefest" Christian of the Mughal Empire. He made donations to the church, helped in the compilation of chronicles, and retained his faith throughout his life as described by the 17th-century traveller Jean-Baptiste Tavernier: "The Armenian had been brought up with Shah Jahan, and as he was very clever and an excellent poet he was high in the good graces of the Emperor, who had given him valuable governorships, but had never been able, either by promises or threats to induce him to become a Mussulman [Muslim]."

One of the principal sources for his life is the accounts of the Jesuit Fathers who described him as the "Father of the Mogor Christians", in reference to the donations he made to the Jesuits there, and the "Pillar of Christianity in India".

== Death ==
Zulqarnain probably died in 1656 and may have been buried with his mother and wife in the family mausoleum in Lahore. His father had left money in his will for the establishment of a "cemetery for the deceased Christians of Lahore" but no trace of Zulqarnain's interment has been found. He is included in the list of Mughal nobles for 1657 and 1658, raising doubt about the exact year of his death.
