= Hasan Agha (Armenian) =

Armenian merchant

Hasan Agha (Note: Also Hasan Ağa.) (?—1656) was an Armenian merchant and Ottoman official in 17th century. He was customs officer of Istanbul (1646–1656). He was a brother of Anton Çelebi.

He was to an Orthodox Christian Armenian, an Ottoman subject from Bursa.

He converted to Islam, taking on the name Hasan. He ascended through the ranks of the Ottoman bureaucratic structure to attain the post of customs officer of Istanbul, which he occupied from 1646 to 1656.

He was executed in the Çınar incident in 1656.

== Sources ==
- Kuru, Mehmet; Whitehead, Christopher; Mercan, Özden; Yavuzer, Gamze (12 July 2023). Ergene, Boğaç (ed.). A Global-Microhistorical Study of the 17th-Century Mediterranean World: The Armenian Brothers, Hasan Agha and Anton Çelebi (Session 3) [abs.] (PDF). Early Modern Ottoman Studies Conference (EMOS). Middle East Technical University (METU), Ankara, Turkey. Archived (PDF) from the original on 2024-02-21.
- Kuru, Mehmet (12 July 2023). "The Trans-Mediterranean Family of Hasan Agha and Anton Çelebi [abs.]" (PDF). A Global-Microhistorical Study of the 17th-Century Mediterranean World: The Armenian Brothers, Hasan Agha and Anton Çelebi (Session 3). Early Modern Ottoman Studies Conference (EMOS). Middle East Technical University (METU), Ankara, Turkey. Archived (PDF) from the original on 2024-02-29.
- Mercan, Özden (12 July 2023). "A Man of Two Worlds: Anton Çelebi's Extraordinary Life in Livorno [abs.]" (PDF). A Global-Microhistorical Study of the 17th-Century Mediterranean World: The Armenian Brothers, Hasan Agha and Anton Çelebi (Session 3). Early Modern Ottoman Studies Conference (EMOS). Middle East Technical University (METU), Ankara, Turkey. Archived (PDF) from the original on 2024-02-21.
- Yavuzer, Gamze (12 July 2023). "Who is the Lawful Heir?: Anton Çelebi's Trans-imperial Inheritance Case between Florence and Istanbul [abs.]" (PDF). A Global-Microhistorical Study of the 17th-Century Mediterranean World: The Armenian Brothers, Hasan Agha and Anton Çelebi (Session 3). Early Modern Ottoman Studies Conference (EMOS). Middle East Technical University (METU), Ankara, Turkey. Archived (PDF) from the original on 2024-02-27.
