= Anton Çelebi =

Armenian silk merchant (1604–1674)

Anton Bogos Çelebi (Note: Also Antonio (Anton) Bogos and Antoine Cheleby.) (Armenian: Անտոն Չելեբի; 1604 – 1674) was an Armenian merchant magnate and Ottoman and later Tuscan official in 17th century. Gonfalonier of Livorno. He was a brother of Hasan Agha.

== Name and title ==
Anton bore the title çelebi. (Note: Spellings: Celebi, Chelebi, Çelebi and Cheleby.)

== Biographical facts ==
=== Life in the Ottoman Empire ===
Anton Bogos Çelebi was born in Bursa. He came from an Orthodox Armenian family and had a brother who would later convert to Islam and take the name Hasan. Anton's and Hasan's father was an Orthodox Christian Armenian, an Ottoman subject from Bursa. Hasan Agha eventually became customs officer (gümrük emini) of Constantinople (now Istanbul), capital of the Ottoman Empire, from 1646 to his death in 1656.

Unlike his brother, Anton remained a Christian. He was a wealthy silk merchant in the second quarter of the 17th-century and had his offices both in İzmir (also called Smyrna) and Constantinople. Hasan assisted Anton's rise in his official posts in İzmir and Bursa. Eventually the two brothers became considerable economic and political actors, as well as rich merchants in the extensive commercial networks from London to Isfahan.

Sometime around 1650s, Anton served as the governor of Bursa and the customs officer (tax collector) of Izmir and the customs officer of the silk trade in Bursa until his brother Hasan Agha was executed in the Çınar incident in 1656, a large soldiers' revolt directed against financially powerful people in the government of Ottoman Empire. After this Anton fled the country.

It was during his governorship when the Venetian traveler Niccolao Manucci passed through Bursa on his route to Mughal Empire. He was entertained by Anton in his "country house." Sensing threats to his life and wealth from the Sultan, Anton had taken measures to relocate his fortunes from the Ottoman Empire to Livorno. He fled to the city during Manucci's visit.

=== Life in Italy ===
Anton arrived in Livorno, converted to Catholicism and significantly involved in commercial activities. He became a Tuscan citizen.

Anton's flexibility and adaptability facilitated his establishment of connections with prominent individuals, including members of the Medici family, and to assume active roles in the Livorno's administration. His "oriental" dressing style, proficiency in both Ottoman Turkish and Italian languages, and his expansive commercial networks rendered him a crucial intermediary between Levantine merchants and the Tuscan authorities. Anton had an Ottoman-style palace that functioned as an important meeting point for merchants of Levant and migrants from the Ottoman Empire and generated a robust network facilitating the exchange and dissemination of knowledge and information. By virtue of his close links with the Medici, he became gonfalonier, being elected as the head of the administrative city council. In this office he governed the city for a while.

In Livorno, Anton opened a hammam (Turkish bathhouse) and had six ships in his possession, that twice a year sailed between Izmir or Alexandretta (now İskenderun) and Livorno. According to Lucia Frattarelli Fischer, Anton Çelebi was a highly significant shipowner in the small Tuscan fleet.

Chelebies family was a wealthy merchant family in Livorno, whose members were very active participants within the Armenian community of the city.

Anton died in Livorno. He died intestate and had no children, leaving behind a huge estate.

== Legacy ==
Anton left behind a huge estate, dying without a will and childless. It caused complex series of court cases among his "potential" heirs from the Ottoman capital city. The Florence court had to dispatch its officials to Constantinople to gather evidence regarding the heirs, while the potential heirs had to undertake the journey to Florence to claim their shares in Anton's inheritance.

The connections between the Ottoman Empire and the Italian states set up by Anton via his commercial activities throughout his life remained active after his death through the court disputes over his heritage.

The vessel named "Jerusalem", that was built and belonged to the late Anton Çelebi, was involved in a famous incident in 1695 when, on the way from Constantinople to Jerusalem, it was captured by French corsairs, who robbed all the pilgrims on board and left them on an island naked and starving for 4 days. The incident, widely found in scholarly and literary works, was so widely known at the time that it was featured as a plot in an early modern poem by a female witness.

== Personality ==
Anton was an Armenian. Originally an Orthodox Christian, he converted to Catholicism after moving to Livorno.

== Sources ==
- Artinian, Vartan (1988). The Armenian Constitutional System in the Ottoman Empire, 1839—1863: A Study of its Historical Development. Istanbul.
- Aslanian, Sebouh (2011). From the Indian Ocean to the Mediterranean: The Global Trade Networks of Armenian Merchants from New Julfa. California: University of California Press. ISBN 978-0520947573.
- Kuru, Mehmet; Whitehead, Christopher; Mercan, Özden; Yavuzer, Gamze (12 July 2023). Ergene, Boğaç (ed.). A Global-Microhistorical Study of the 17th-Century Mediterranean World: The Armenian Brothers, Hasan Agha and Anton Çelebi (Session 3) [abs.] (PDF). Early Modern Ottoman Studies Conference (EMOS). Middle East Technical University (METU), Ankara, Turkey. Archived (PDF) from the original on 2024-02-21.
- Kuru, Mehmet (12 July 2023). "The Trans-Mediterranean Family of Hasan Agha and Anton Çelebi [abs.]" (PDF). A Global-Microhistorical Study of the 17th-Century Mediterranean World: The Armenian Brothers, Hasan Agha and Anton Çelebi (Session 3). Early Modern Ottoman Studies Conference (EMOS). Middle East Technical University (METU), Ankara, Turkey. Archived (PDF) from the original on 2024-02-29.
- Mercan, Özden (12 July 2023). "A Man of Two Worlds: Anton Çelebi's Extraordinary Life in Livorno [abs.]" (PDF). A Global-Microhistorical Study of the 17th-Century Mediterranean World: The Armenian Brothers, Hasan Agha and Anton Çelebi (Session 3). Early Modern Ottoman Studies Conference (EMOS). Middle East Technical University (METU), Ankara, Turkey. Archived (PDF) from the original on 2024-02-21.
- Tajiryan, Sona (2020). The Early Modern Global Trade of Diamonds and Gems: An Armenian Family Firm on the Crossroads of Caravan and Maritime Trade (ca. 1670-1730) (Thesis).
- Yavuzer, Gamze (12 July 2023). "Who is the Lawful Heir?: Anton Çelebi's Trans-imperial Inheritance Case between Florence and Istanbul [abs.]" (PDF). A Global-Microhistorical Study of the 17th-Century Mediterranean World: The Armenian Brothers, Hasan Agha and Anton Çelebi (Session 3). Early Modern Ottoman Studies Conference (EMOS). Middle East Technical University (METU), Ankara, Turkey. Archived (PDF) from the original on 2024-02-27.
