= Shemavon of Agulis =

Shemavon (Simon) of Agulis or Shemavon Aguletsi (Note: "Aguletsi" literally translates as "from Agulis".) was an Iranian official of Armenian origin, who served during the reign of King (Shah) Suleiman I (r. 1666-1694).

He functioned as mint master (zarrab-bashi) of the important Erivan mint (the provincial capital of the Erivan Province) under four successive governors; Mohammadqoli Khan, Najafqoli Khan Cherkes, Abbasqoli Khan Qajar, and Safi Khan Lezgi. In 1670, he was appointed mint master of the Safavid capital of Isfahan by Shah Suleiman I.

Shemavon was the brother of Zakaria of Agulis (i.e. Zakaria Aguletsi), a merchant of the Safavid era who is mostly remembered for his journal, an important primary source on the history of the Safavid period. Unlike Zakaria, who stayed Christian, Shemavon was a convert to Islam.

== Sources ==
- Babaie, Sussan; Babayan, Kathryn; Baghdiantz-McCabe, Ina; Farhad, Massumeh (2004). Slaves of the Shah: New Elites of Safavid Iran. I.B.Tauris. ISBN 978-0857716866.
- Bournoutian, George (2003). The Journal of Zak'aria of Agulis. Mazda Publishers. pp. 1–242. ISBN 978-1568591070.
- Matthee, Rudi; Floor, Willem; Clawson, Patrick (2013). The Monetary History of Iran: From the Safavids to the Qajars. I.B. Tauris. pp. 1–320. ISBN 978-0857721723.
- Ghougassian, Vazken (2008). "Wealthy merchants and factors. The legacy of Julfa". In Chaudhury, Shushil; Kévonian, Kéram (eds.). Les Arméniens dans le commerce asiatique au début de l'ère moderne. Maison des Sciences de l'Homme. p. 68. ISBN 978-2735112043.
