= Khwaja Safar =

First kalāntar of New Julfa

Khvajeh Safar
- Խոջա Սաֆար

Kalāntar of New Julfa
- In office 1605–1618
- Monarch: Abbas I

Personal details
- Born: Old Julfa
- Died: 1618
- Occupation: Merchant, Safavid official

Khvajeh Safar was an Armenian merchant and Safavid official, who served as the first mayor (kalāntar) of New Julfa (the Armenian quarter of Isfahan), from 1605 until his death in 1618. He was of Armenian origin. A member of the influential Shafraz family (also spelled Safraz), he was bestowed with the title by then incumbent king Abbas I (r. 1588–1629) in recognition of his father's (Khvajeh Khachik) rank of melik in Old Julfa, and his instant submission to Abbas I when the latter retook the area. The next three subsequent kalantars were all from Khvajeh Safar's family, while the last member of the family that held the post was Khvajeh Haikaz (1656–1660).

== Sources ==
- Aslanian, Sebouh (2011). From the Indian Ocean to the Mediterranean: The Global Trade Networks of Armenian Merchants from New Julfa. University of California Press. ISBN 978-0520947573.
- Babaie, Sussan (2004). Slaves of the Shah: New Elites of Safavid Iran. I.B.Tauris. ISBN 978-1860647215.
- Matthee, Rudolph P. (1999). The Politics of Trade in Safavid Iran: Silk for Silver, 1600-1730. Cambridge: Cambridge University Press. ISBN 978-0521641319.
