= Zakaria Aguletsi =

Historic traveler who published important documents

- Born: 1630; Agulis, Nakhchivan (present-day Azerbaijan)
- Died: 1691 (aged 60–61)
- Occupations: Merchant, Traveler, Writer
- Known for: Extensive travel writings
- Notable work: Travel journals documenting cultural, social, and economic aspects of various countries

Zakaria Aguletsi (1630 – 1691) or Zakaria of Agulis was an Armenian merchant born in Agulis located in present day Nakhchivan who gained recognition for his extensive writings about his travels to different countries. He meticulously documented the cultural, social, and economic aspects of the places he visited, and his journals remain a valuable resource for scholars and historians.

== Biography ==
Zakaria is best known for his travel journals, which he meticulously wrote during his journeys to various countries, including Persia, India, Russia, and Turkey, among others. His writings provide a rare insight into the cultural, social, and economic conditions of the regions he visited, as well as his observations on local customs, traditions, and beliefs.

Zakaria's journals were not only a record of his personal experiences but also served as valuable information for other merchants and traders. He shared detailed information on trade routes, commodities, and pricing, which helped his fellow merchants in making informed business decisions.

Zakaria of Agoulis' travel diary during his voyage to Europe from the Araxes to Amsterdam via Venice in 1657-9, and his subsequent return journey in 1659-60 through Cadiz, was released in Yerevan in 1938.

== See also ==
- Shemavon of Agulis
