= Abgar Ali Akbar Armani =

Armenian in Safavid Iran who converted from Christianity to Shia Islam

- ابگر (علی‌اکبر) ارمنی

Personal life
- Born: Mid-11th century AH (mid-17th century CE) New Julfa, Isfahan, Safavid Iran
- Died: After Dhu al-Qi'dah 1119 AH (27 January 1708 CE) Probably Isfahan, Safavid Iran
- Flourished: Late 11th–early 12th century AH (late 17th–early 18th century CE)
- Parent: Khoja Poghos
- Era: Safavid period
- Region: Persia (modern-day Iran)
- Main interest(s): Religious conversion and Christian–Muslim relations
- Notable work: I'tirāf-nāma (Confession Book)
- Known for: His I'tirāf-nāma and his conversion from Armenian Christianity to Islam
- Other names: Hovhanjan, ʿAlī Akbar Armanī
- Occupation: Merchant and writer

Religious life
- Religion: Islam
- Denomination: Shia
- School: Akhbari
- Sect: Twelver
- Jurisprudence: Ja'fari

Muslim leader
- Influenced by: Biblical scriptures, Hajji Piri, Sunni and Shiʿi scholars encountered during his travels

Abgar was an Armenian in Safavid Iran who flourished during the reigns of Shah (King) Suleiman I (r. 1666–1694) and Shah Soltan Hoseyn (r. 1694–1722). Originally a merchant, he later converted from Christianity to Shia Islam and took the name Abgar Ali Akbar Armani. Over time, he became estranged from the Armenian community, and increasingly associated with members of the Safavid clergy and later married into their families. He wrote a conversion narrative in Persian, the I'tirāf-nāma ("Confession Book"), which was conceived perhaps as a missionary tool, and for circulation among Armenian Christians. According to Alberto Tibrucio, this work "fills an important gap as a rare example of a testimony narrated from the perspective of a convert and portraying a voluntary conversion".

== Biography ==
What little is known about his life is largely drawn from his work, the I'tirāf-nāma ("Confession Book"). Born Abgar, possibly in New Julfa, the Armenian quarter of Isfahan, he spent the early part of his life as a merchant. He may have been a member of either the renowned Velijanian (or Veligianian) merchant family of Venice or the Sceriman (Shahremanian) family, although the latter is considered less likely. Around 1673, during the reign of Safavid Shah (King) Suleiman I, he converted from Christianity to Shia Islam, a decision which, according to his writings, was inspired by a scriptural evidence as well as a series of visions and dreams. At the time of his conversion, he had been in contact with the Armenian mayor (kalāntar) of New Julfa, Hajji Piri, who was also a convert.

Armani reportedly became estranged from his family after being branded an apostate. His subsequent trip to Venice resulted in his imprisonment "in retaliation for allegations of mistreatment of Christians in Iran", but he was later released through the intervention of his brother. After his release, he journeyed to the Ottoman cities of Constantinople and Belgrade before returning to Isfahan via the Safavid cities of Erivan, Tabriz and Mashhad.

He is known to have married on numerous occasions and sired a number of children with his various wives. After his conversion, he increasingly associated with members of the Safavid ulama, and would marry into their families. His first wife, whom he met her during his journey, was the daughter of a judge and hailed from Constantinople. According to Alberto Tiburcio, he was persecuted in Constantinople "for his assumed Shi'i allegiance as an Iranian". However, it appears that at the time Armani was not yet an adherent of Shia Islam, at least not initially, but had developed a Shi'ite identity through the course of his journey. In later life, his relations with the Armenian community would deteriorate to the point that he became a target of their persecution. Tiburcio wrote that, in retaliation, Armani "claims to have engaged in a quasi-ritual cursing of Armenian priests, leading to the death of the latter". Armani died sometime after 27 January 1708, possibly in Isfahan.

== Work ==
Armani's work, the I'tirāf-nāma, was completed on 27 January 1708 during the reign of Shah Soltan Hoseyn (r. 1694–1722) and was written entirely in Persian. Only one manuscript of this conversion narrative, consisting of 73 folios, is extant and is stored in the University of Tehran. According to Tiburcio, the I'tirāf-nāma, though written in Persian, was probably conceived as a missionary tool and for circulation among Armenian Christians "as far as the surviving evidence suggests". Its prose is simple, yet "rich in symbolism", and describes Armani's conversion and travels. His use of "oneiric elements" in his work to describe his "spiritual journey into Islam" has led Tiburcio to suggest that he had access to conversion narratives stemming from other milieus. The work also includes the "standard" biblical reference to the Paraclete of the Gospel of John, an example of inter-religious polemic often used in conversion narratives to express "proof" for Islam from the Bible.

Though the Persian chronicles, European travelogues and correspondences between Christian missionaries reveal that many converted from Christianity to Islam during the Safavid period, they only depict instances where the converts were either forced to convert or did so out of convenience. Such accounts generally do not provide insights into the personal views of the converts. According to Tiburcio, the I'tirāf-nāma "fills an important gap as a rare example of a testimony narrated from the perspective of a convert and portraying a voluntary conversion".

== Sources ==
- Tiburcio, Alberto (2018). "Persia: Abgar ʿAlī Akbar Armanī". In Thomas, David; Chesworth, John A. (eds.). Christian-Muslim Relations. A Bibliographical History. Volume 12 Asia, Africa and the Americas (1700–1800). Brill. ISBN 978-9004384163.
