= St Gregory of Tigran Honents =

Armenian Church in Ani, Turkey

Church of Saint Gregory the Illuminator ("Tigran Honents")
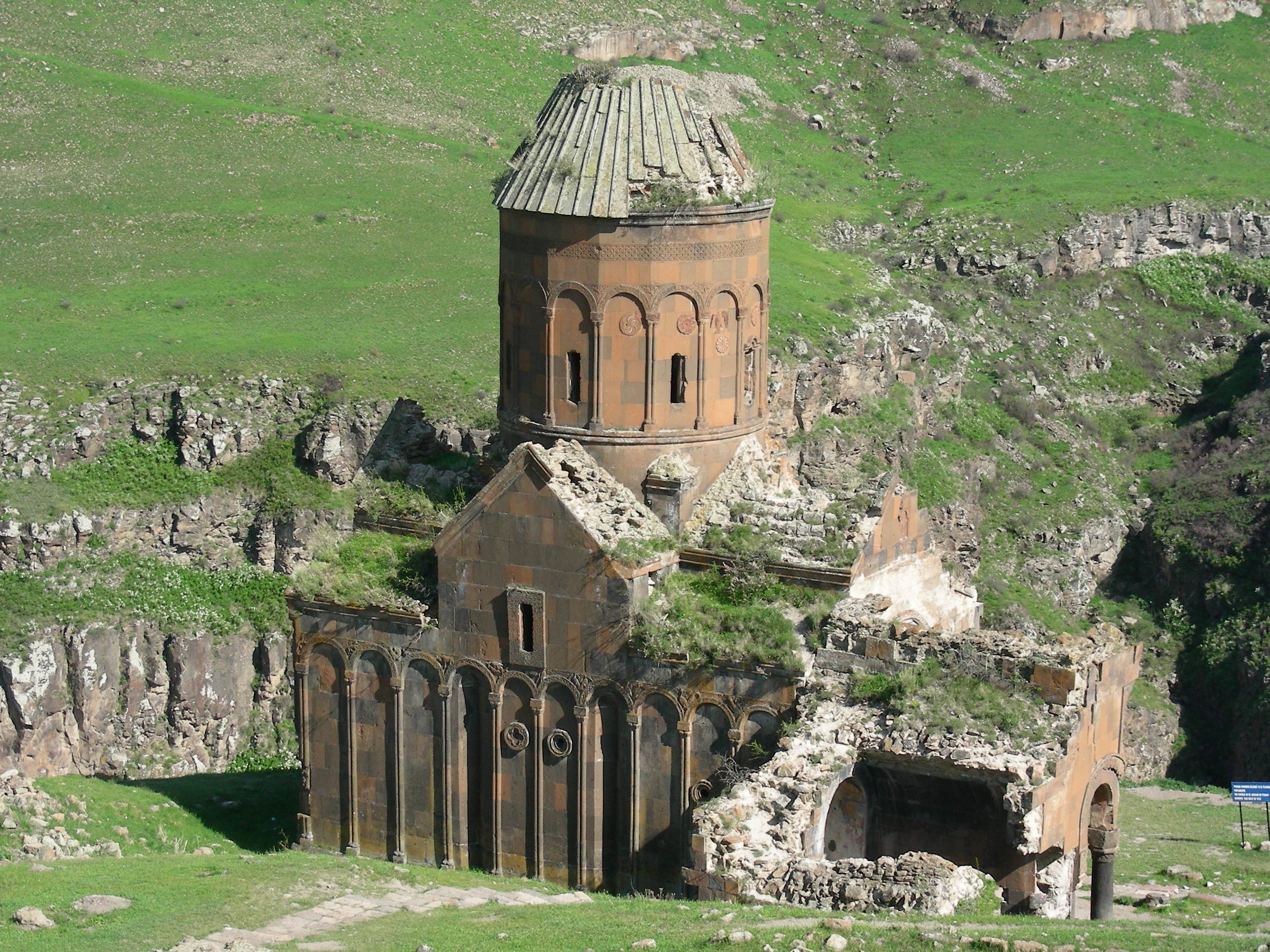
- Church of Saint Gregory the Illuminator ("Tigran Honents")

- Location within Armenia Location within Turkey Location within West and Central Asia

Religion
- Affiliation: Armenian Apostolic Church

Location
- Location: Ani, Turkey, on the frontier with Armenia
- Coordinates: 40°30′27″N 43°34′22″E

Architecture
- Style: Armenian
- Completed: 1215
- Dome: 1

The Church of St Gregory of Tigran Honents (Armenian: Սուրբ Տիգրան Հոնենց եկեղեցի), or Church of Saint Gregory the Illuminator (Armenian: Սուրբ Գրիգոր Լուսավորիչ եկեղեցի) is a medieval religious structure located in Ani, in Turkey's Kars province next to the closed border with Armenia. It was built by the Armenian Tigran Honents under the Zakarids in 1215, according to an inscription in Armenian on the exterior of the church.

== Context ==
The building of the church came at a tumultuous period: in 1064 the city of Ani had been captured by the Seljuks from the Byzantines, who granted it to a Kurdish line of muslim emirs known as the Sheddadids. Then in 1199, the Zakarids, vassals of the Kingdom of Georgia, captured Ani with a combined Georgian and Armenian army. Their reconquest of Ani and a large part of historical Armenia greatly revived the fortunes of the region, essentially thanks to increased trade. The actual extent of the Zakarians' vassalship towards the Georgian crown remains unknown, but it may have been purely nominal, especially since as they adopted "the trappings of both Christian and Muslim royal power", as shown in their adoption of the title "Shahanshah" (king of kings) for their names and titles. In the dedicatory inscription of Tigran Honents, the Zakarians are referred to as the only "overlords", and the "powerful masters of the universe".

After only a few decades of restored Armenian control, Ani was then captured and destroyed by the Mongols in 1239, during the disastrous campaign leading to the Georgian–Mongolian treaty of 1239.

== Construction ==
The Zakarids were active builders of religious monuments as shown by the church of Tigran Honents, or the Church of Kizkale, also in Ani.

=== Style ===
The interior of the church is covered in frescoes, which all follow Byzantine styles and layout. A large cycle (17 out of 18 scenes) is dedicated to Saint Gregory the llluminator, who was the evangelist of Armenia, but the murals also include one scene devoted to Saint Nino, the evangelist of Georgia. The various pictorial scenes are identified exclusively with painted labels in Greek and Georgian.

Inscriptions in Armenian are found engraved on the walls outside of the church, and are dedicatory in nature. Numerous sculptures, mainly representing animals and decorating walls and pillar capitals also have Armenian inscriptions: each carved stone in the church is engraved with a letter in the Armenian alphabet, probably used as mason's marks.

The church has a large quantity of murals, many of them depicting the events of the life of Tiridates III of Armenia ("Trdat"), the first Christian ruler of Armenia. The paintings are focused on the main feasts of the Chalcedonian Church. They may have been completed a few years after the construction of the church, but they are still the earliest known fresco program in Ani. The paintings, exclusively labelled in Georgian, may have belonged to a Georgian artistic tradition, as suggested by style, technique (intense blue backgrounds), and iconographical details.

Islamic features have also been identified in the muqarnas decorative elements of some of the capitals, and in the sculptures on the outside of the church, especially in the animal repertoire.

=== Attribution ===
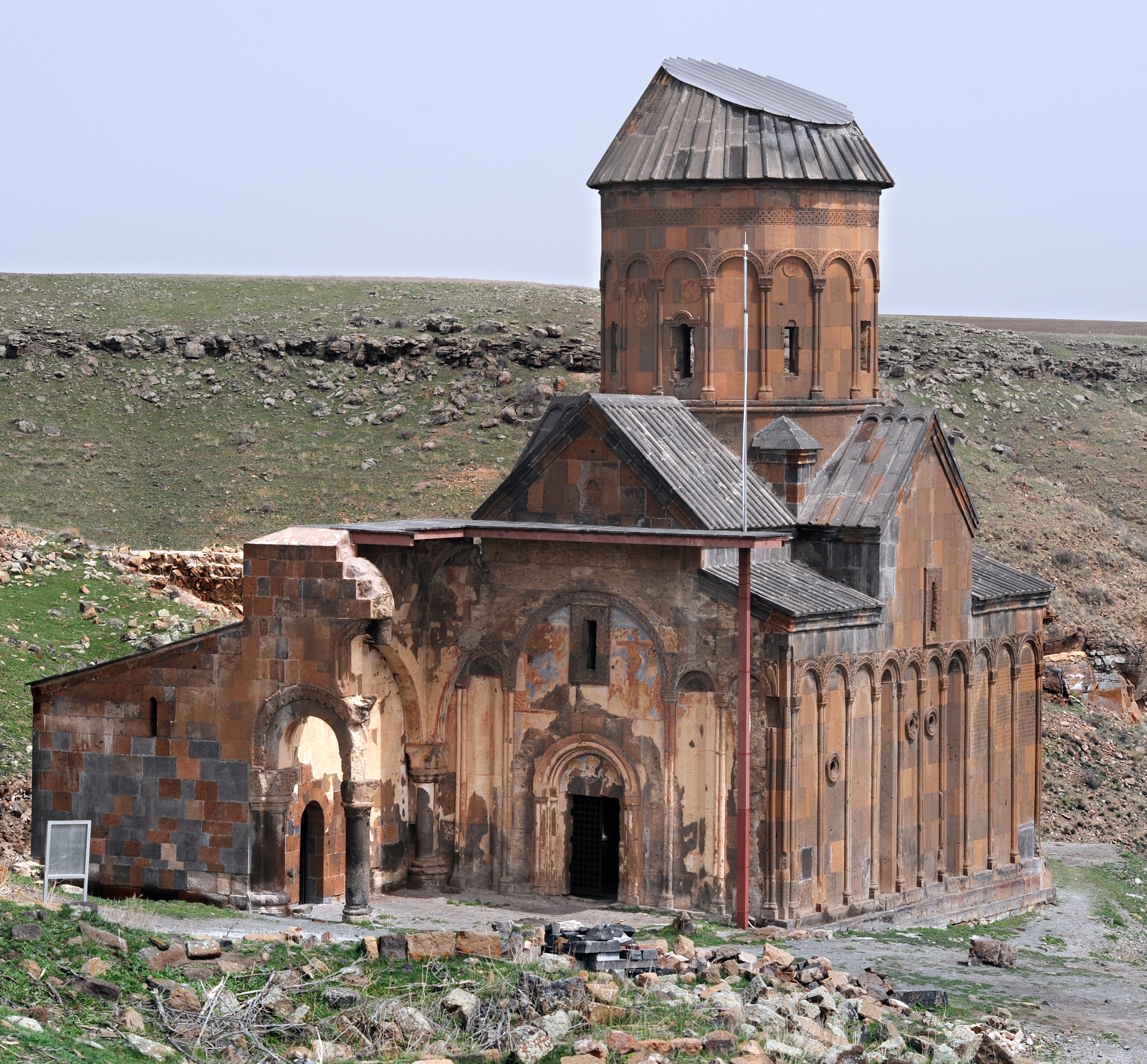
The Saint Gregory (Tigran Honents) in Ani after restoration

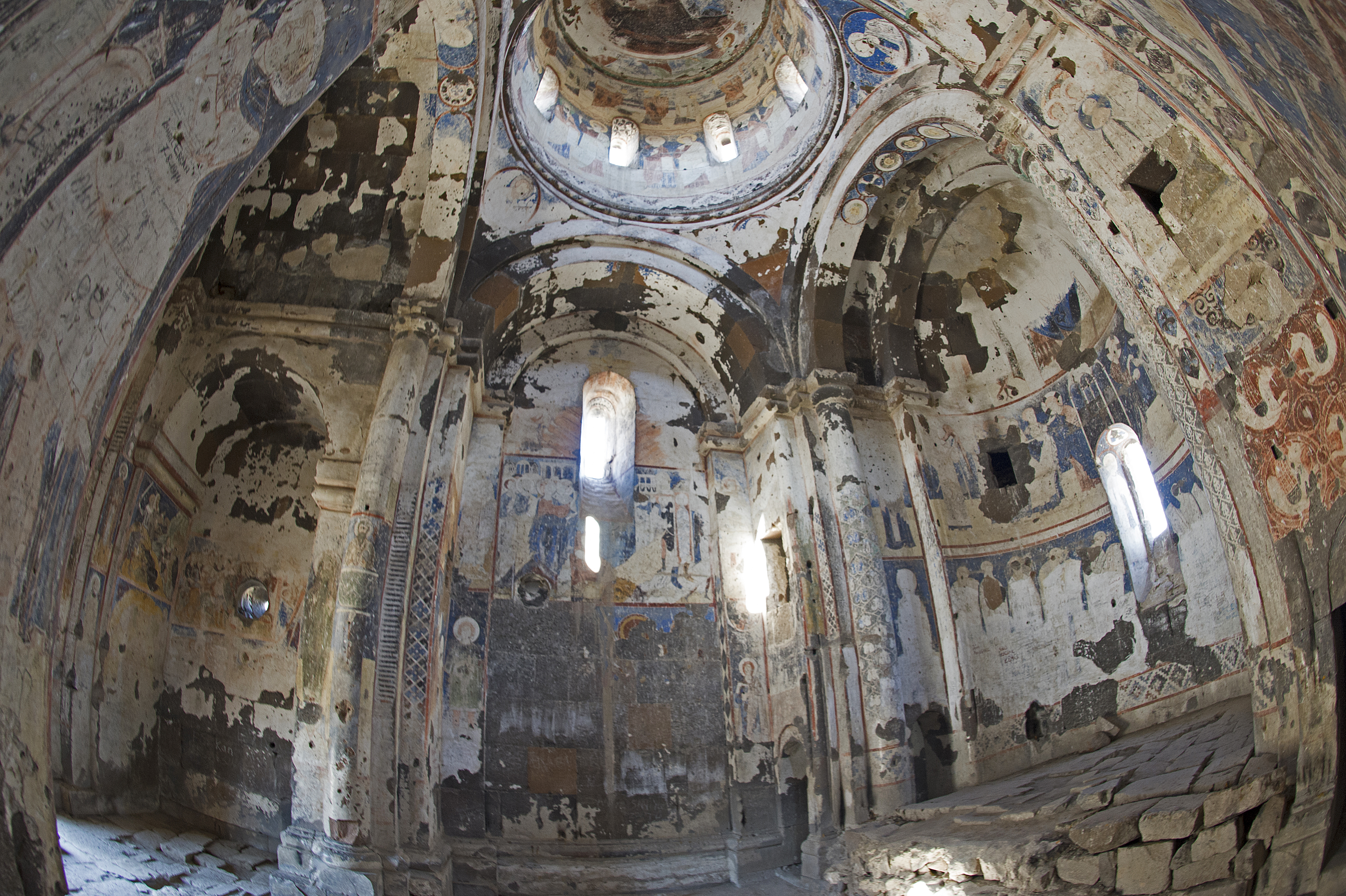
Interior of the church, covered with frescoes

Ani and its region had mixed confessional identities, with Armenians being mainly Monophysites, and Georgians and Greeks mainly Chalcedonian Christians, and relations were often conflictual. But the boundaries were moveable: Ivane I Zakarian had converted to Chalcedonism in the early 13th century, and a significant number of Armenians had followed him, voluntarily or not.

In St Gregory of Tigran Honents, the combination of scenes with the myths of the evangelists of Armenia and Georgia might suggest a conflation of Armenian Monophysite and Georgian Chalcedonian rites. Still, the dedication by Tigran Honents is Monophysite in nature as it is made in the name of the "three holy councils and the nine choirs of angels". The style and iconography of the paintings does borrow from Georgian art and uses inscriptions in Georgian only, but several characteristics are decidedly Armenian and relate to Monophysism. Armenia relatively lacked a tradition of monumental painting at the time, so there is a possibility that Georgian artists had to be hired in order to accomplish the pictorial program.

Since the donator was identified as Armenian Monophysite in his inscription, but on the other hand the artistic program rather reflected the Chalcedonian faith, the church may also have belonged to a Chalcedonian community of Armenians, who had chosen to adopt Georgian styles and practices. Preferring to only take into account the style of the murals, one author has simplistically presented the church as a "Georgian church".

Alternatively, although the donator of the church was Armenian, the church may have served a larger community of both Armenians and Georgians. The Zakarids may also have promoted a level of ambiguity between the two faiths, and voluntarily mixed elements from both, minimizing differences, possibly as a political expedient helping them better rule their realm. This may be seen in the light of their other known efforts at church councils to bring together the Monophysite and Chalcedonian faiths, especially at the level of their outward expression, such as procedures and visual elements.

=== Dedication ===
The church was dedicated by the Armenian Tigran Honents (Dikran Honents), as declared in an inscription in Armenian on the southern wall of the church:

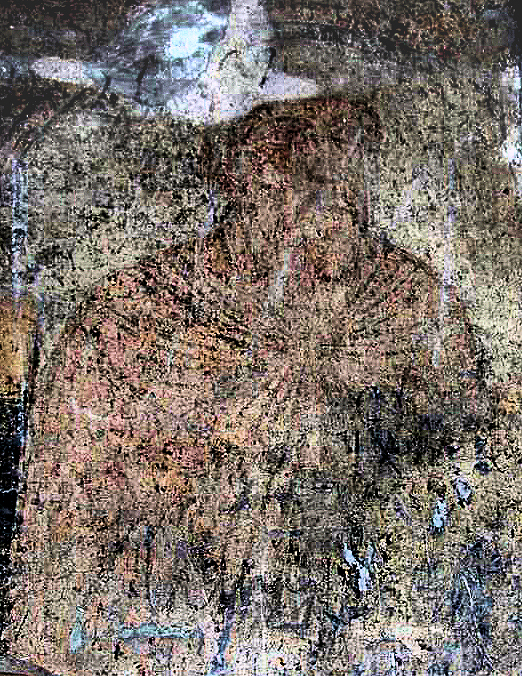
Shahnshah Zakarian was ruling Ani when the church was dedicated in 1215.

In the year 664 [1215], by the mercy of God, when the powerful master of the universe Amirspasalar and Mandaturtukhutsesi Zakare and his son Shahnshah became masters of this city of Ani, I Dikran, servant of God, son of Sulem of the Smpadawrents, of the Honents clan, for the sake of the long life of my lords and their sons built this monastery of St. Krikor, which used to be called "Mother of God of the Chapel", which was at a precipice and with wooded places, which I bought with my legitimate treasure from the hereditary owners, and by means of much labor and treasure I enclosed this church with a wall all around. I built this church in the name of Saint Krikor the Enlightener and adorned it with many ornaments, with symbols of salvation, with holy crosses of gold and silver, and painted images, adorned with gold and silver and jewels and pearl, and with lanterns of gold and silver, and with relics of the holy apostles, of the martyrs, and with part of the dominical cross that has received God, and with all kinds of utensils of gold and silver, and with numerous ornaments. I built all kinds of habitations for the monks and princes, and arranged in them priests who celebrate the mass of the body and blood of Christ to perform mass without obstruction for the long life of my lords Shahnshah and his sons, and for the absolution of my sins; and I gave this gift to this monastery of St. Krikor land which I had bought with treasure and by decision of the masters of the land, and which I had built from the foundation... [list of gifts] Now, if any of the great or small of my [people] or of foreigners attempt to obstruct what is written in my inscription, or usurp things from the products which are established in it, or obstruct the memory of this sinning servant of God for any reason, let such an individual be excluded from the glory of the son of God and inherit the punishment of Cain and Judas on his person and be anathematized by the three holy councils and the nine orders of angels and be responsible for our sins in front of God; and those who are obliging and keep firm are blessed by God. Israegh [Israel] the Scribe.

— Dedication of St Gregory by Tigran Honents.

Tigran Honentsis also known to have sponsored the renovation of a staircase in the Cathedral of Ani in 1213, and the building of the Monastery of the Virgins, also at Ani.

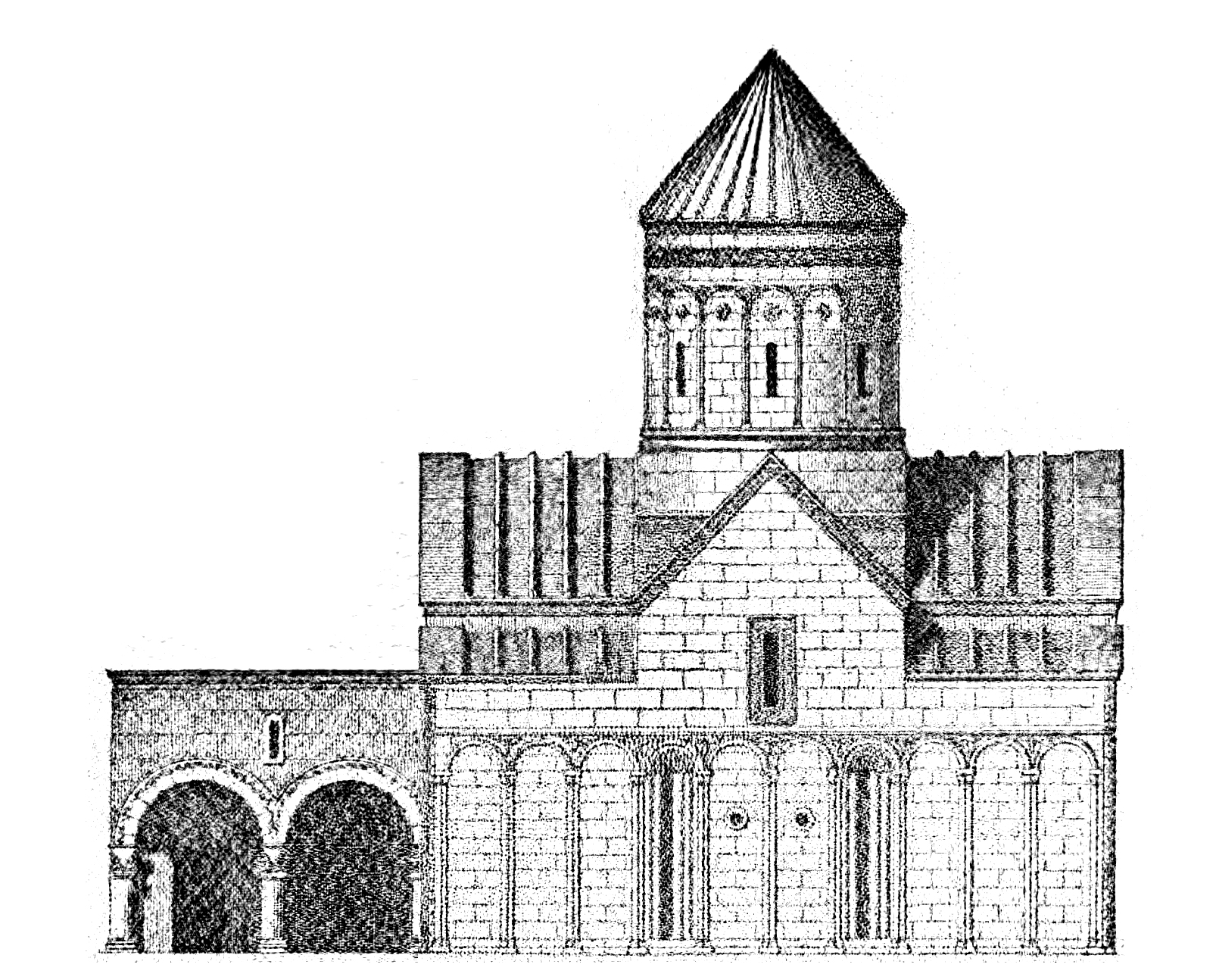
St Gregory of Tigran Honents, reconstruction.

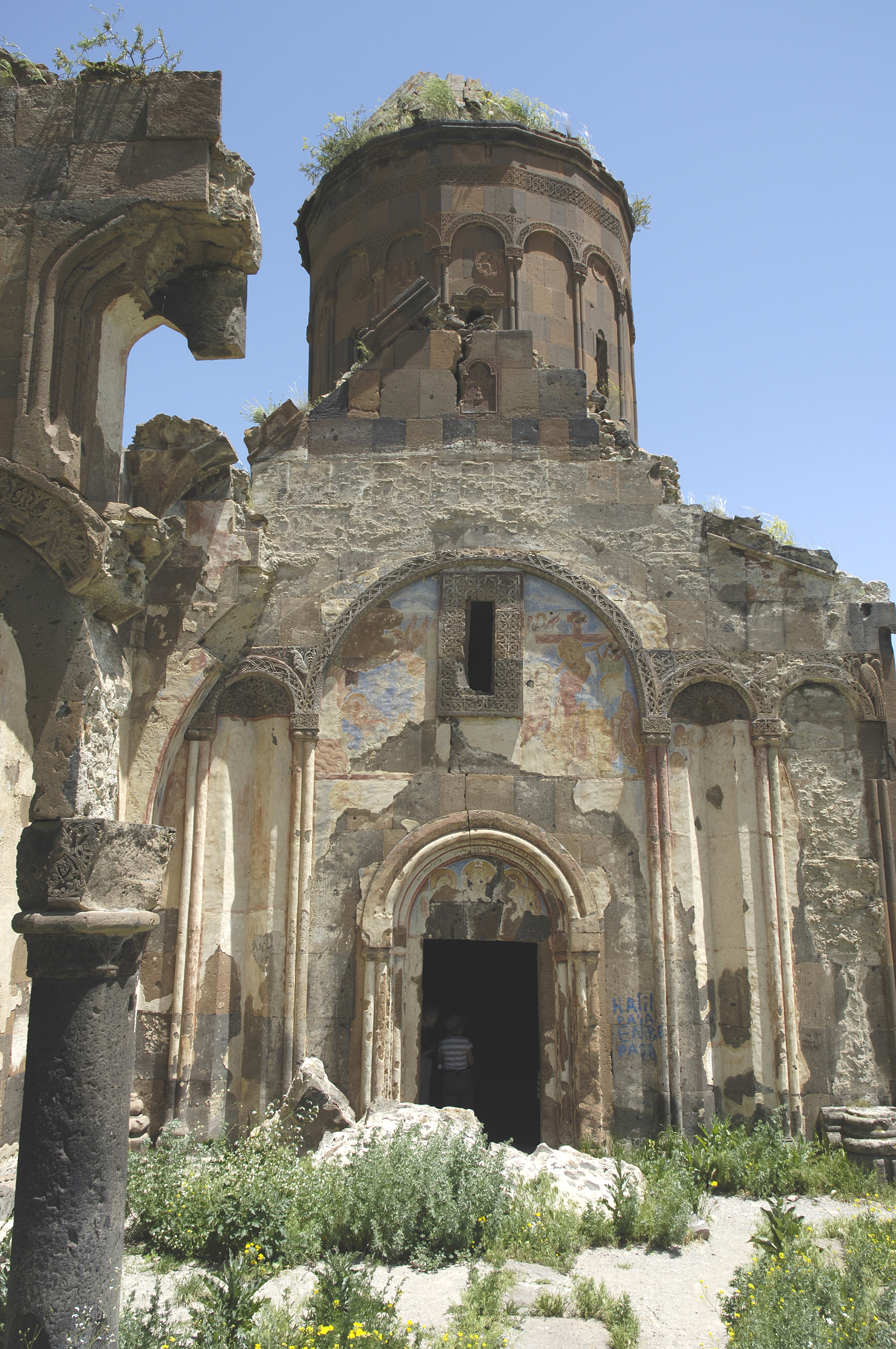
Zakarid church of Tigran Honents, Ani, 1215.

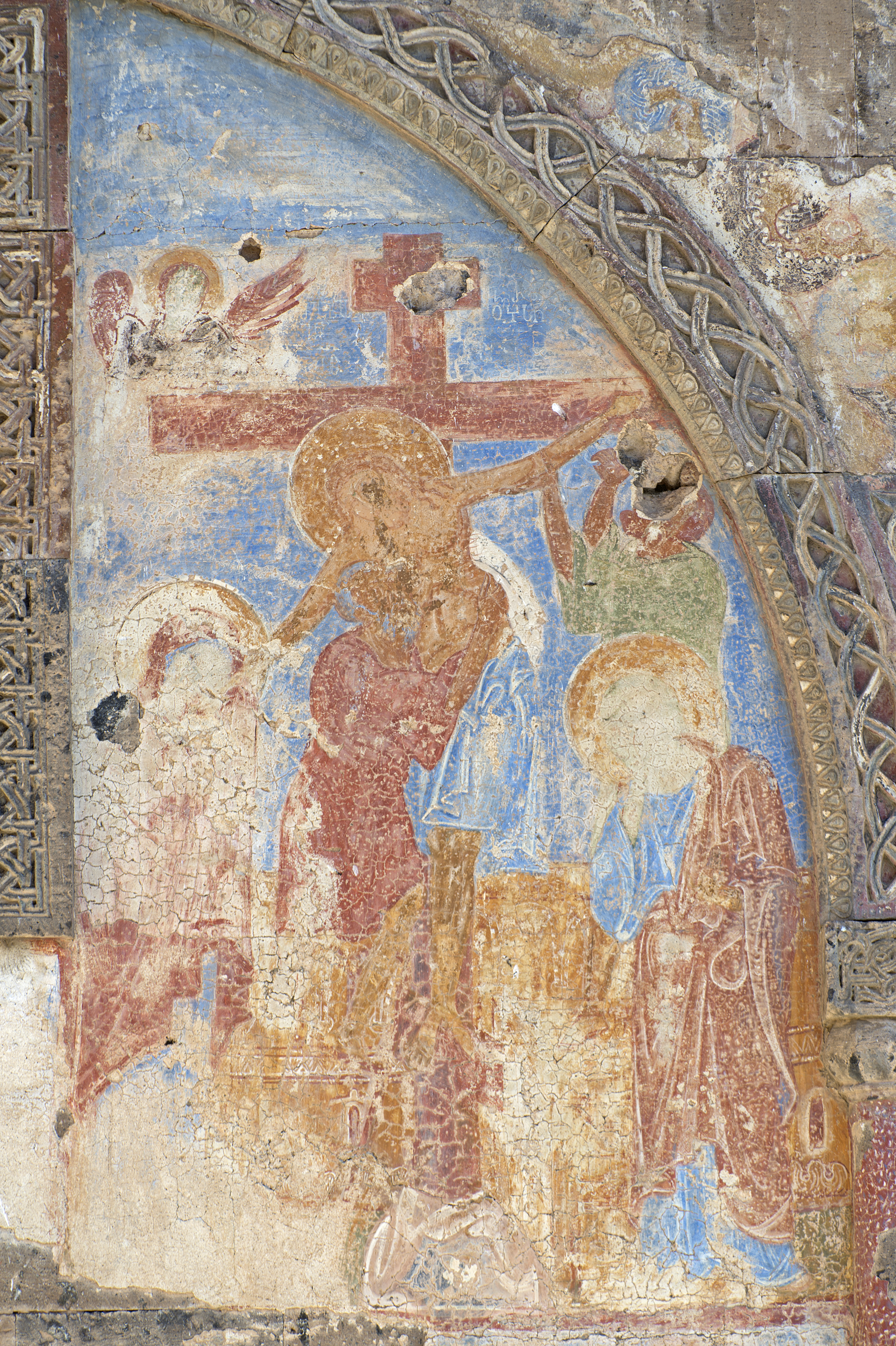
Zakarid church of Tigran Honents, Ani, 1215.

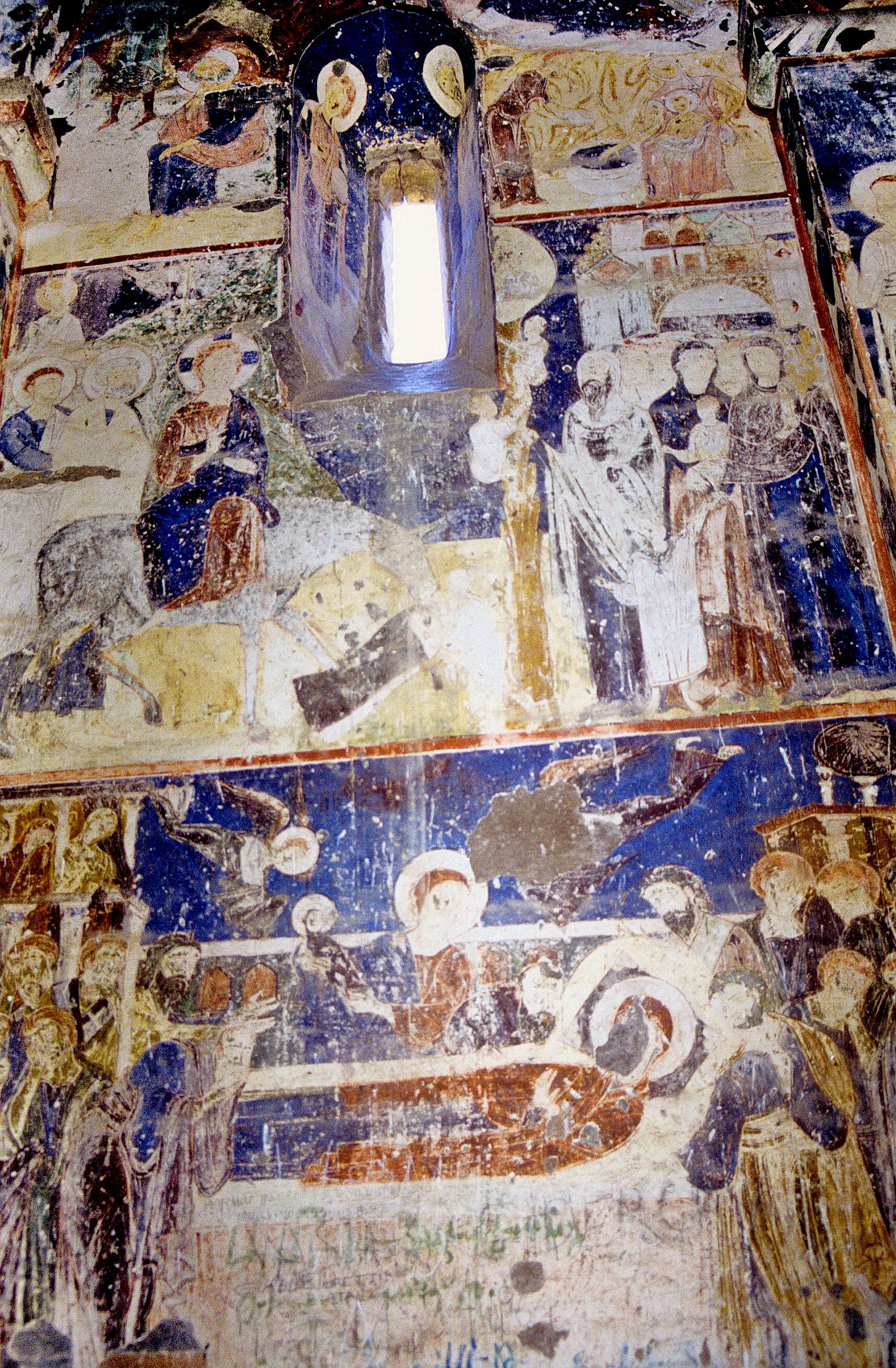
Zakarid church of Tigran Honents, Ani, 1215.

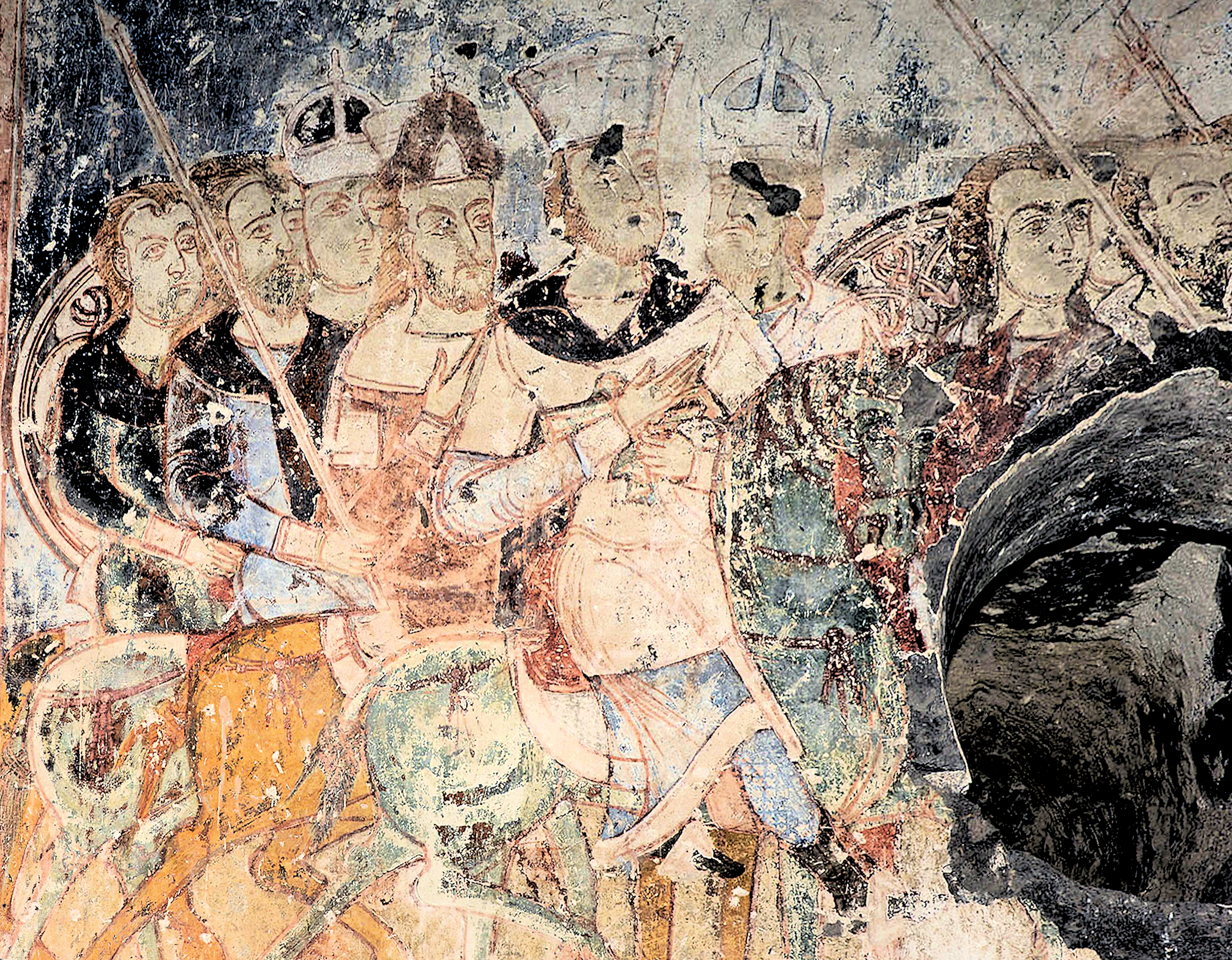
Departure of Armenian king Tiridates III (c.250–330) with the Entourage of Georgian (Iberian), Laz and Albanian Kings for Their Christening. Zakarid church of Tigran Honents, Ani, 1215.

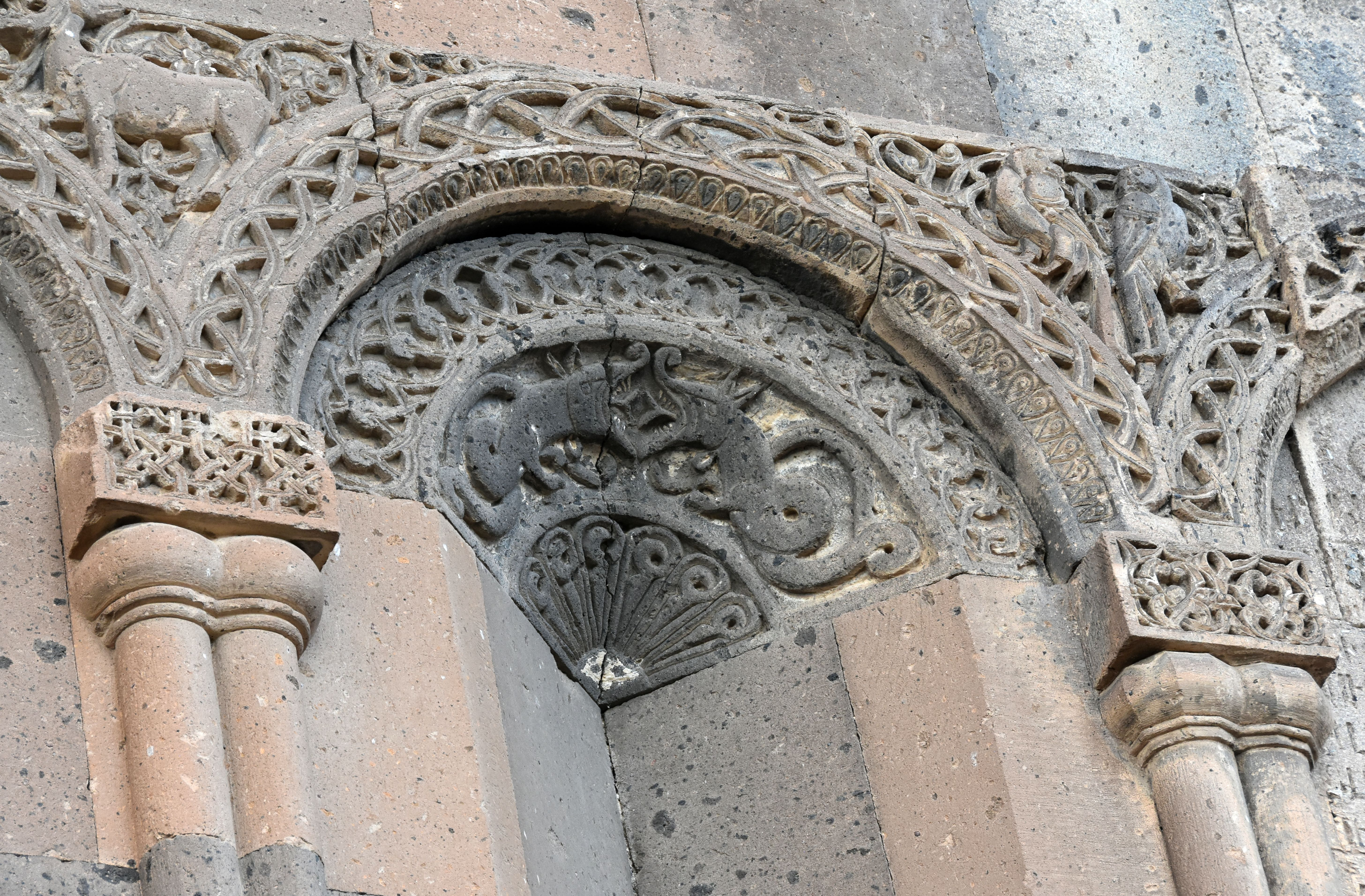
Wall decoration with facing dragons, at Tigran Honents

== Sources ==
- Kalas, Veronica (2008). "The Georgian Aspects of Medieval Architecture at Ani in the Thirteenth Century: The Church of Tigran Honents and the Mosque of Minuchir". In Tumanishvili, D. (ed.). Georgian Arts in the Context of European and Asian Cultures. Tbilissi: Georgia Arts and Cultural Center. pp. 211–216.
- Blessing, Patricia (8 March 2017). Architecture and Landscape in Medieval Anatolia, 1100-1500. Edinburgh University Press. pp. 156–159. ISBN 978-1-4744-1130-1.
