= Hajji Piri =

Iranian-Armenian merchant (died c. 1693)

Hajji Hajji Piri
- حاجی پیری

Personal life
- Born: 17th century New Julfa, Isfahan, Safavid Iran
- Died: c. 1106 AH (1693–1694 CE) Isfahan, Safavid Iran
- Flourished: Late 11th–early 12th century AH (late 17th–early 18th century CE)
- Era: Safavid period
- Region: Persia (modern-day Iran)
- Main interest(s): Commerce, community administration, and religious conversion
- Known for: Kalāntar of New Julfa and Mo'ayyer ol-mamalek
- Other names: Khvajeh Piri, Agha Piri, Mohammad Piri
- Occupation: Merchant and government official

Religious life
- Religion: Islam
- Denomination: Shia
- School: Usuli
- Sect: Twelver
- Jurisprudence: Ja'fari

Senior posting
- Post: Mo'ayyer ol-mamalek (1692–1693)
- Influenced by: Armenian Apostolic Christianity, Catholic Christianity, Safavid Shiʿi Islam
- Influenced: Abgar Ali Akbar Armani

Hajji Piri or Khvajeh Piri or Agha Piri and later known as Mohammad Piri was an Armenian merchant and Safavid official. He served during the reign of King (Shah) Suleiman I (r. 1666–1694) as mayor (kalāntar) of New Julfa, and briefly as controller of the assay (mo'ayyer ol-mamalek). He was also one of the wealthiest merchants in the Safavid state.

== Biography ==
He was of Armenian origin. Hajji Piri is known to have converted on two occasions. On the first occasion, he converted from Oriental Orthodoxy (Armenian Apostolic Church) to Catholicism. Catholic Armenians were considered outsiders by Apostolic Armenians, and were dubbed Frangs (i.e. "Franks"). On the second occasion (24 August 1673), Hajji Piri converted from Catholicism to Shia Islam. According to French traveler Jean Chardin, Hajji Piri knew that his conversion to Islam would stir up trouble among New Julfan Armenians, as he was the community's leader and most important member. Chardin tells that two weeks before his apostasy, Hajji Piri went to the royal Safavid court and begged the nazer ("steward") to make it seem like a forced conversion. Hajji Piri managed to convince the nazer to help him by giving him 600 ducats. In addition, he told that if his conversion came to be known as a voluntary act, the Armenian merchants abroad would not come back, and would settle in Europe while keeping their goods and money. This would cause grave economic loss. Thus, the nazer decided to help Hajji Piri and reportedly staged a scene, saying loudly: "the Shah orders you to become Moslem, he must be contented".

Ina Baghdiantz-McCabe notes that Hajji Piri wanted it to look like a forced conversion for economic reasons. He was given the name Mohammad Piri after conversion. Baghdiantz-McCabe notes that Hajji Piri was not only the mayor (kalāntar) of New Julfa, but also one of the richest merchants in the country. According to Chardin, after conversion, he married a daughter of a prominent member of the Queen Mother's household. In 1692–1693, he served as mo'ayyer ol-mamalek ("controller of the assay"), which signifies that he had risen to even greater prominence. In the year following his appointment, in 1693–1694, Hajji Piri resigned from his post as controller of the assay. He died a month later.

== Sources ==
- Baghdiantz-McCabe, Ina (1996–1997). "The Socio-Economic Conditions in New Julfa Post-1650". Revue des Études Arméniennes. 26: 367–396. doi:10.2143/REA.26.0.2003758.
- Kostikyan, Kristine (2012). "European Catholic Missionary Propaganda among the Armenian Population of Safavid Iran". In Floor, Willem; Herzig, Edmund (eds.). Iran and the World in the Safavid Age. I.B.Tauris. ISBN 978-1780769905.
- Matthee, Rudi (2012). Persia in Crisis: Safavid Decline and the Fall of Isfahan. I.B.Tauris. ISBN 978-1-84511-745-0.
- Matthee, Rudi; Floor, Willem; Clawson, Patrick (2013). The Monetary History of Iran: From the Safavids to the Qajars. I.B. Tauris. ISBN 978-0857721723.
- Tiburcio, Alberto (2018). "Persia: Abgar 'Alī Akbar Armanī". In Thomas, David; Chesworth, John A. (eds.). Christian-Muslim Relations. A Bibliographical History. Volume 12 Asia, Africa and the Americas (1700–1800). Brill. ISBN 978-9004384163.
