= Lady Juliana (Agra) =

Aide of Mughal emperor Akbar

- Born: Juliana Mascarenhas
- Occupation: Physician to Mughal emperor Akbar's royal harem
- Years active: fl. mid 1500s
- Known for: Built first church in Agra

Lady Juliana (fl. mid 1500s) was a woman who lived at the court of Mughal emperor Akbar. She is said to have been the physician in charge of Akbar's royal harem, and to have married the legendary Bourbon prince Jean-Philippe de Bourbon-Navarre, and to have been the sister of one of Akbar's wives. She is credited with building the first church in Agra (now in India).

== Origins ==
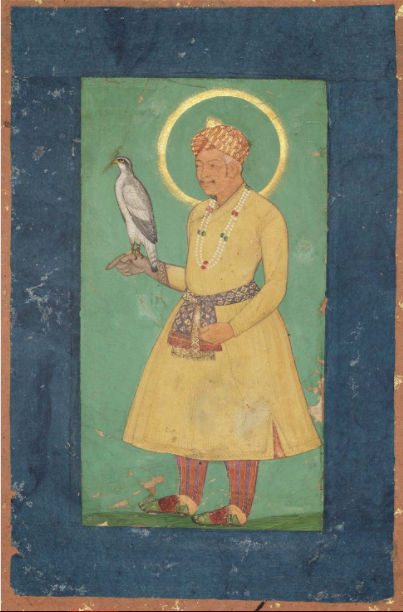
Mughal emperor Akbar

Lady Juliana was the sister of Akbar's Christian wife and was the physician in charge of the royal harem. At some point these sisters were brought to Agra.

One account is that Juliana and her sister were the daughters of Abdul Hai, Akbar's Chief Justice and that they were from Cilicia in Western Armenia.

Rev. Thomas Smith, an historian, scholar and journalist who was born into an Indo-Armenian family in Agra reports Lady Juliana as Armenian and given to Jean-Phillipe by Akbar.

In Prince Michael of Greece's research on the descendants of Jean-Phillipe de Bourbon, he feels "certain that he [Jean-Phillipe] was the son of Charles III, the Constable of France, the richest and most famous and powerful member of the family". In Prince Michael's book Le Rajah de Bourbon, Jean-Phillipe married the Portuguese sister of the Christian wife of Akbar, was also given a large amount of land and became a Rajah (king) in India. He also explains how Jean-Phillipe was the first Bourbon French king, Henry IV's nephew and how sometime before 1560, Jean-Phillipe embarked on a worldwide adventure before landing at the gates of Akbar's empire. His subsequent marriage to Lady Juliana after she tended to him during a severe illness and was then gifted to him by Akbar, produced a long line of Bourbons in Bhopal, India.

Others too, have claimed her as Portuguese but research published by Zaman in 2012 has disputed Portuguese scholar, J. A. Ismael Gracias's belief that Akbar's wife or her sister were Portuguese. Many other ladies were also named Juliana. One Portuguese Lady Juliana Dias da Costa came later into Mughal history and her story may be contributory to the confusion with Lady Juliana Mascarenhas. Gracias describes Akbar's wife Maryam Makani being Maria Mascarenas and her sister being Juliana. This too is false according to Zaman, who argues that Maryam is the name given to Akbar's mother, Hamida Banu Begum.

Frederick Fanthome in Reminiscences of Agra (1895) expresses his conviction that Akbar had a Christian wife named Mary whose influence on Akbar had been underestimated by other historians. He recounts the story of Jean-Phillipe and similarly states his conviction of Akbar's leanings toward Christianity.

Untangling the Julias for Gracias and Fanthome was not so vital if understood in the context of their [Julias] Christian faith and combined bloodlines and associations with the Mughals being the significant theme. In addition, it was also not irrational to understand why the Greek Prince would have an interest too, as in the 2007 article in The Guardian entitled “Found in India: The Last King of France”. In conclusion, Zaman understands previous accounts being part fact and part fiction at a time when Christian influences via European women appeared attractive, particularly in the final days of the Mughal Empire.

== Life in India ==
Akbar allegedly arranged Juliana's marriage to Prince Jean Philippe de Bourbon of France in 1560 and paid for the construction of the church they built in 1562.

== Death ==
According to the Agra Mission archives, she was buried with her husband in the church they established in 1562, although their remains were never found. Mughal Emperor Shah Jahan had the church demolished in 1636. The Native chapel was rebuilt over the site and in the compound of St Peter's Roman Catholic Cathedral.

Descendants of Lady Juliana and Jean-Philippe with the name "Bourbon" continue to reside in Bhopal.
