= Abdul Hai (chief justice) =

Abdul Hai (fl. late 1500s) was an Armenian who was chief justice (Mir Adl) in the Mughal Empire during the reign of Akbar (1556–1605). He is described in the Tabaqat as an Amir, and in the Ain-i-Akbari (Constitution of Akbar) as "the Qazi of the Imperial Camp".

According to Mesrovb Jacob Seth, his daughter Lady Juliana (died 1598), a doctor in Akbar's seraglio, married Armenian merchant Sikandar Mirza. Their son was Mirza Zulqarnain (c. 1594 – c. 1656), who was an important official within the court of Shah Jahan.
