= Sikandar Mirza =

Armenian merchant (died 1613)

Sikandar Mirza (Note: Or Iskander/Alexander Mirza) (died 1613) was an Armenian merchant who travelled from Aleppo to Lahore and became a trusted figure within Akbar's court in the Mughal Empire.

According to Mesrovb Jacob Seth, he married Lady Juliana (died 1598), a doctor in Akbar's seraglio, and the daughter of the Armenian chief justice Abdul Hai. Seth says she was given to Sikandar by Akbar.

His son was Mirza Zulqarnain (c. 1594 – c. 1656) who was an important official within the court of Shah Jahan.
