= Petik and Sanos =

Armenian silk magnates and tax-farmers

The brothers Petros (Petik) (Note: Armenian: Պետիկ, romanized: Petik [peˈtik]; Western Armenian: Պետիկ, romanized: Bediɡ [beˈdiɡ].) and Sanos (Note: Armenian: Սանոս, romanized: Sɑnos [sɑˈnos]; Western Armenian: Սանոս, romanized: Sɑnos [sɑˈnos].) were Armenian merchant magnates and Ottoman government tax-farmers from Old Julfa. They played a crucial role in the silk trade in Aleppo during the late 16th and first half of the 17th centuries, operating an extensive commercial network that reached the Dutch Republic and the Indian subcontinent and were important patrons of the Armenian community.

Besides their commercial activities the brothers also held influential positions. Petik was the chief of customs of Aleppo, Tripoli, and Alexandretta, and thus of all Ottoman Syria, and then in Erzurum. Sanos was the chief of customs of Erzurum, and after the execution of his brother and shortly before his own execution was the chief customs officer of Aleppo. Researchers disagree about the circumstances under which the brothers acquired their great fortune, and with it exclusive power in the city, but they agree that their activity was a remarkable positive period in the history of the Armenian community of Aleppo. The reasons for the executions of Petik and Sanos are still not fully understood.

== Names and titles ==
The name Petik is a diminutive of the Armenian name Petros. His name in the sources is also given as Bedig, but more often as Bedik, diminutives from the Western Armenian form of the name Bedros, corresponding to the Eastern Armenian form Petros. Sanos’s name is also mentioned in the spelling Sonos and he is also referred to as Stepanos.

The names of both brothers are mentioned in sources with the title khwaja (Note: Spellings: Khwaja, Khocha, Khoja, and Hoca.) (before the name), the title çelebi (usually after the name, but sometimes before) and even with two titles simultaneously (khwaja before the name and çelebi after). This double titling of the brothers is explained by the historian Hagop Barsoumian by the fact that their activity fell on the period of semantic erasure of the boundaries between the titles khwaja and çelebi among the Ottoman Armenians. In connection with the frequent and widespread use of the title khwaja, its depreciation took place in the Ottoman Armenian merchant circles, and for some time the use of both titles by Armenian khwajas was observed. Subsequently, the sons of the Ottoman Armenian khwajas massively switched to the çelebi title only, which they perceived as more prestigious. So, for example, the son of Sanos was called Skandar Çelebi. (Note: Also Iskender w. Sanos. (Note: "w." is an abbreviation for walad ("son of") that was used in Ottoman Aleppo records of the time exclusively for non-Muslim males.))

Both brothers are also mentioned under the byname Karagözoğlu (Ottomanist Alexander de Groot believed, and along with him Aleppo historians Hussein El-Mudarris and Olivier Salmon, that the family name was Karagöz (Note: From Turkish — "black-eyed".)). Petik is also referred to as Bedros al-ʿAjami. (Note: ʿajami being the name of the Persian Armenians, in particular the Julfans.)

== Biographical details ==
Khwaja Petik was the son of Kirakos, an Armenian merchant who moved from Old Julfa (Note: Now city in Nakhchivan Autonomous Republic of Azerbaijan.) to Aleppo. Petik and Sanos had at least one other brother. Both brothers were from an Armenian merchant town of Old Julfa. According to the Middle Eastern historian Bruce Masters, they "were among the Julfa Armenians who settled in Aleppo during the first half of the seventeenth century".

=== Silk trade monopoly ===
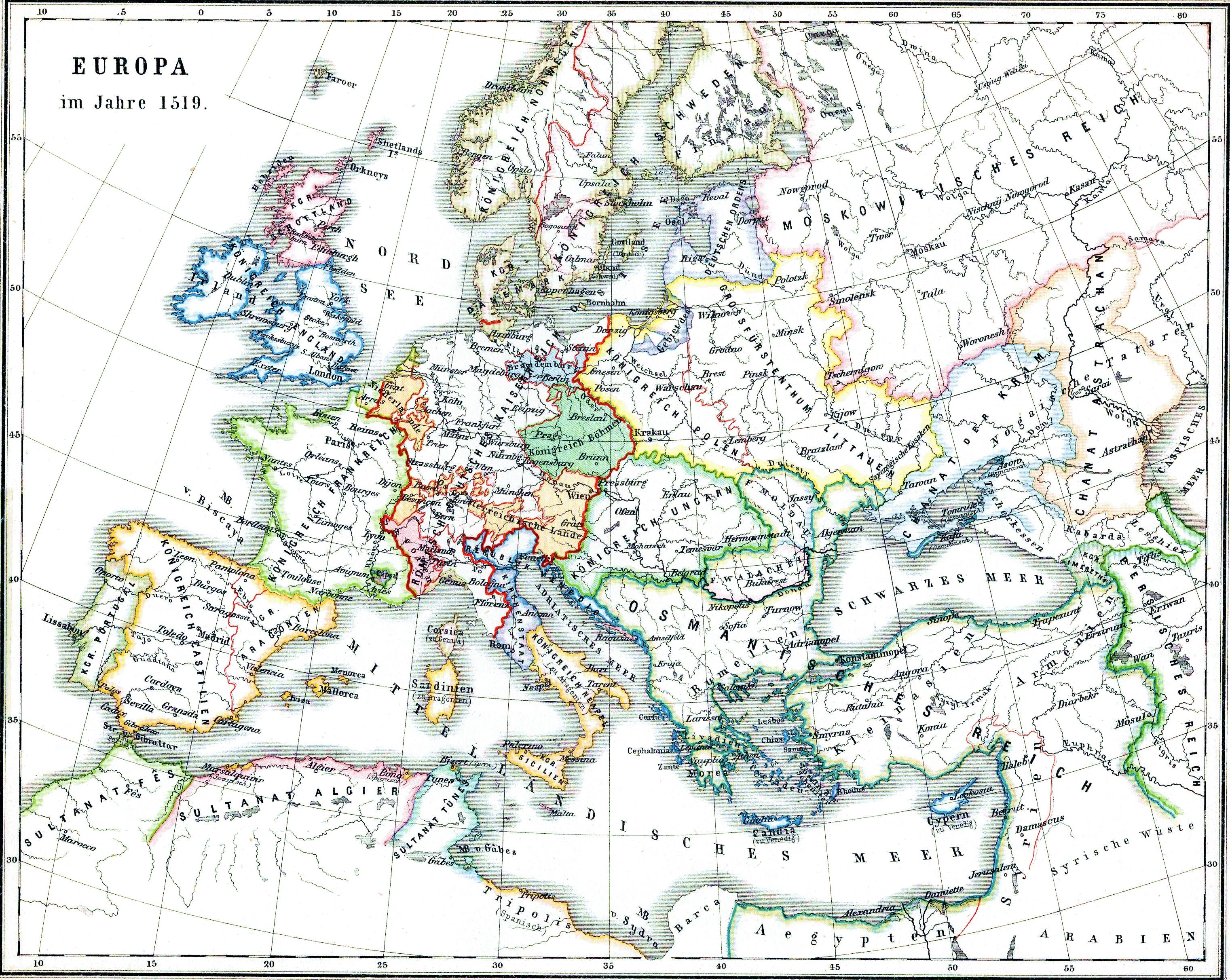
Map in German language Europe in year 1519; in the lower right corner the territory of Western Armenia (Armenien) is indicated, as well as the location of the cities of Erzurum (Erzirum) and Aleppo (Haleb) (Heinrich Kiepert, 1879)

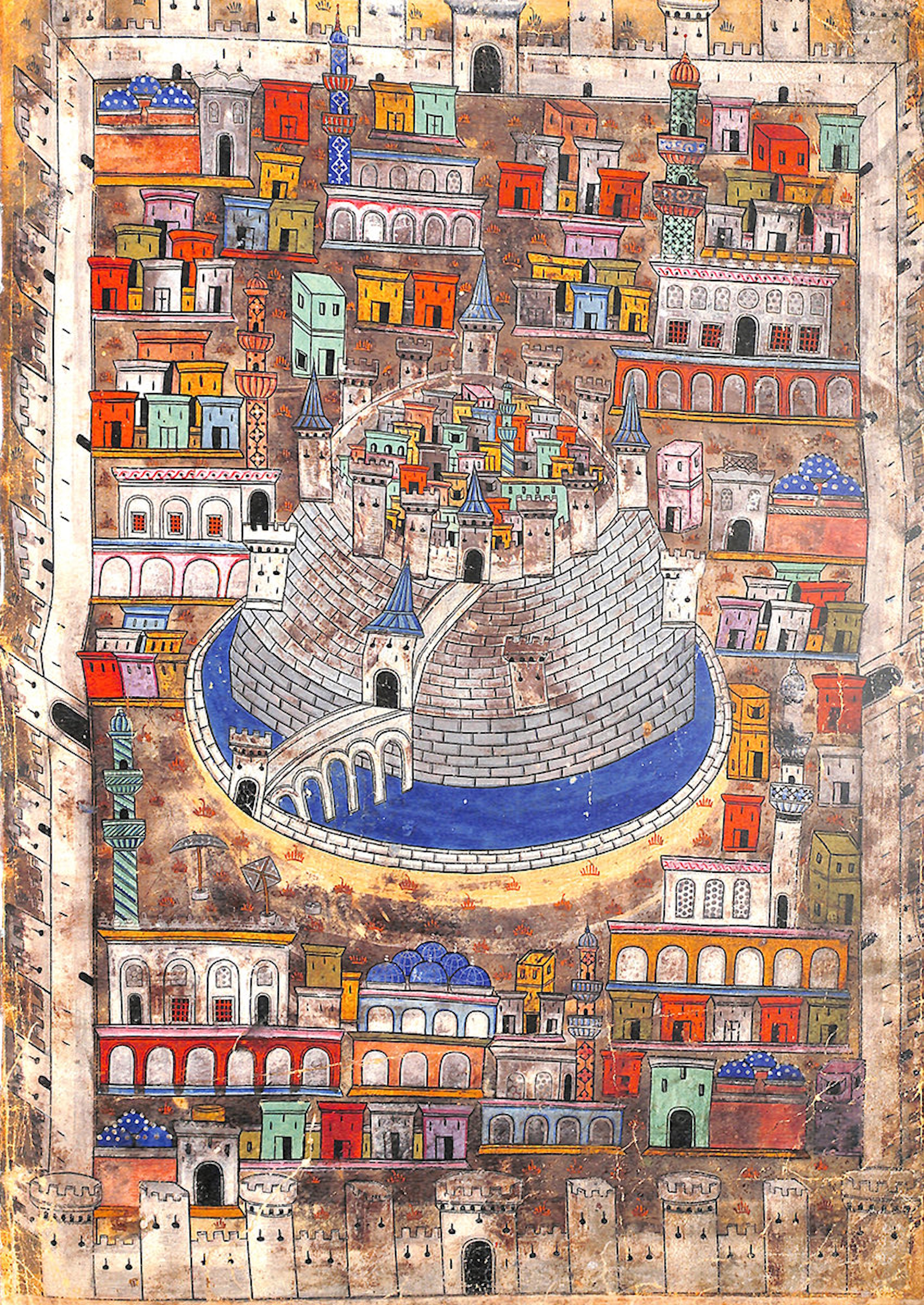
Aleppo, c. 1535 (miniature from “Menazilname” by Matrakçı Nasuh)

Petik and Sanos were the most prominent of the Armenian merchant magnates in Aleppo during the late 16th and first half of the 17th centuries. Petik established a mercantile silk firm in Aleppo, and over time, he and Sanos monopolized the city's silk trade. From about 1590 to 1632, their mercantile firm was preferred by Venetian, Spanish, French, English and Dutch merchants when conducting their silk trade in Aleppo. Petik's family huge trade network in Anatolia, Persia and India was connected with the raw silk trade and the distribution of manufactured goods from Europe. The main markets for their silk and textiles were the Dutch Republic and Italy. Khwaja Sanos was his brother's assistant when Petik held the concession to collect customs duties in Aleppo. Subsequently, Petik held many different official or semi-official positions and was involved in many business matters. The sources of his income were so diverse that his ledgers contained up to twenty-four items at a time, among which were "customs [duties], the inspection of markets, the police superintendency, the khans, the public bath houses" and other income-generative offices purchased from the government.

Khwaja Petik became the richest merchant in Aleppo, and brought substantial income to the imperial treasury. His large-scale entrepreneurial activities were greatly facilitated by his service as manager of the khans, baths and other institutions of Aleppo, and in particular by his position as chief customs officer (Note: emin al-gümrük, emin-i gümrük, emin el-gümrük, or gümrükemini) of Aleppo, Alexandretta and Tripoli, which made him the chief of customs of all Ottoman Syria. In Tripoli, an important Levantine port, Petik's family held high positions for decades. As the main contact agent for all merchants in Aleppo, Khwaja Petik began to play a pivotal role in the city's trade with Europe. Using his social position, Khwaja Petik maintained close contacts with the Sublime Porte and the Sultan's palace in Constantinople. Historian Artavazd Surmeyan, and after him Kéram Kévonian, also call Petik a subashi of Aleppo, but historian Avedis Sanjian believed that this “assertion seems to be based on some misunderstanding”, “since this office was reserved to an agha or kehya of the local Janissaries.” According to historian Elyse Semerdjian, it was after the revolt of the Kurdish leader Ali Janbulad that the brothers gained control over the city's customs and acquired their large fortune. Historian William Griswold believed that the Petik and Janbulad families must have known each other.

Khwaja Petik's main European trade contacts were with the Dutch Republic, and it was even said that he was the Dutch official trade representative in Aleppo. This fact is explained by the existence of an active Armenian community in Amsterdam, the majority of which were also Julfans. Petik's and Sanos's dealings with Dutch businesses went through Cornelis Pauw, the Dutch consul in Aleppo.

=== Customs control ===
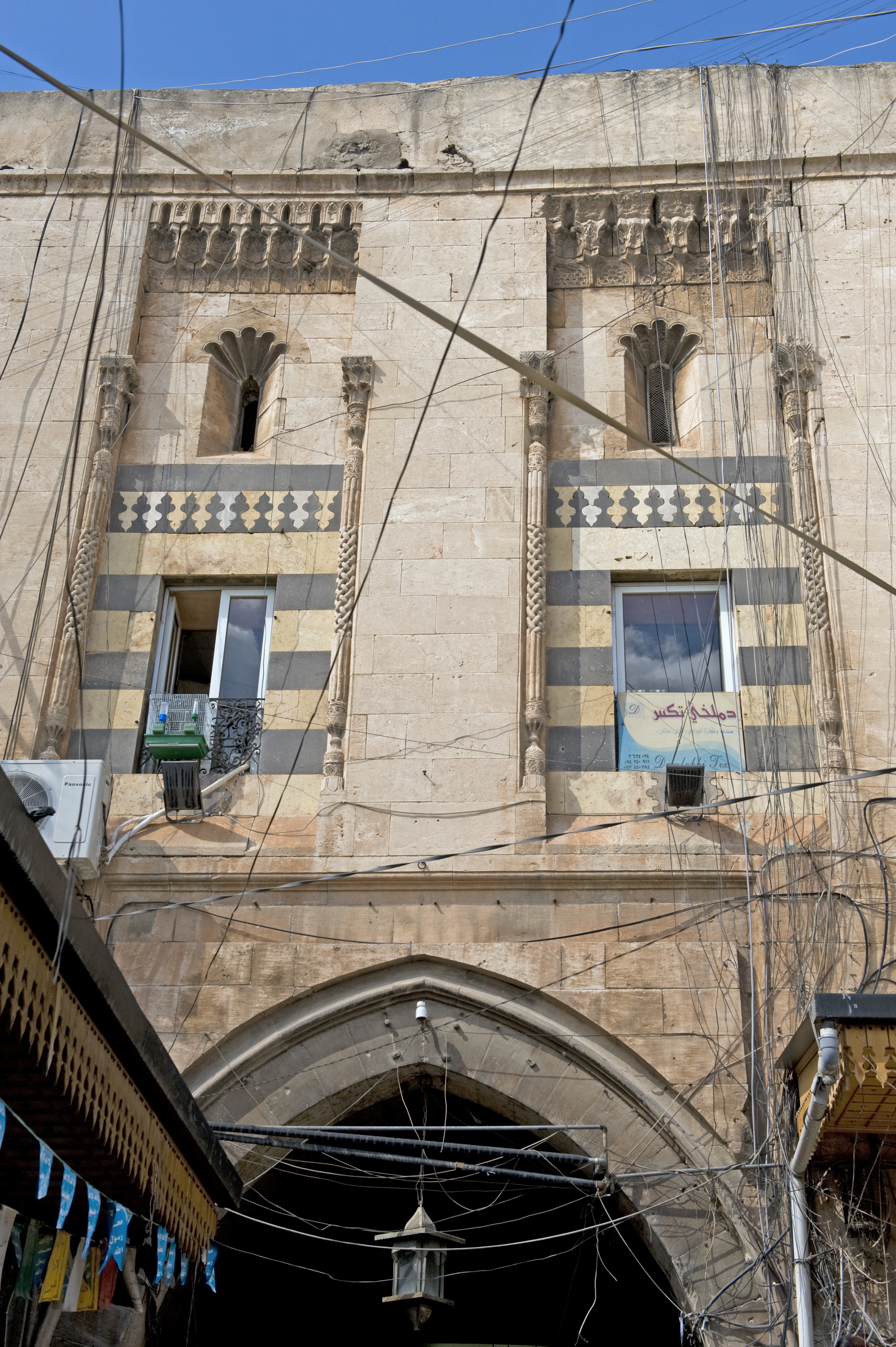
Khan al-Gümrük, the hub for international merchants in Aleppo during that period

Petik and Sanos, along with the Syrian Jew Musa ibn Ishaq, (Note: Also known as Mūsā w. Ishāq al-Khākhām. (Note: "w." is an abbreviation for walad ("son of") that was used in Ottoman Aleppo records of the time exclusively for non-Muslim males.)) are the most important emin-i gümrüks of Aleppo during the period of Armenian-Jewish dominance of this office (until the year 1660). The brothers took over the post following the revolt of Ali Janbulad. Petik served as the chief customs officer more than once. He bought the post in 1612 for nine years, but by 1614 (and under unknown circumstances), he was briefly supplanted by Musa ibn Ishaq. An attempt by Sanos to unseat ibn Ishaq that year was unsuccessful. The rivalry between the brothers and Musa was outlined since they sought to unseat one other. Khwaja Petik regained his position in 1616 by establishing direct contact with the Dutch consul. According to Masters and Semerdjian, he occupied it until 1627 (according to them, this year he was executed). In 1629 Khwaja Sanos took over the customs office of Erzurum (in Western Armenia). As Hagop Barsoumian describes, after working in Syria, Petik was appointed chief customs officer of Erzurum by Murad IV. Also, according to him, during this service of Petik, two brothers rescued from slavery more than a thousand Armenians taken prisoner as booty by what Barsoumian describes as a "Tartar army", who fought on the side of the Ottomans in the war against the Persians in 1638. (Note: The practice of rescuing Armenians captured during the Ottoman–Persian Wars by ransoming them from slavery was common among the Armenian Khwaja class.)

By 1616 Petik was negotiating directly with the Dutch consul regarding the tariffs to be paid by the Dutch Republic in Aleppo. As Masters points out, this was a direct violation of the powers granted to Petik by the Porte. In 1613, the Venetian consul in the city complained about Petik, after he boasted: “I am the collector of customs. No one will imprison me”.

=== Patronage ===
The brothers played an important role in the patronage of the Armenian community, like other wealthy Julfans. In 1616 they donated money for the reconstruction of the Forty Martyrs Cathedral, expanding it so that it could accommodate more parishioners and the Armenian Catholicos. This large-scale restoration confirms the exclusive power of Petik and Sanos, since the construction and expansion of Christian churches contravened the Ottoman building regulations. Aleppo historian Kamil al-Ghazzi cited a local historical anecdote, according to which Murad IV, who passed through Aleppo, urgently personally granted permission to the Julfans to expand and renovate the churches:

This prayer space was expanded in 1639 (Note: According to Semerdjian, this date is inaccurate.) by Bedros al-Ajami, also known as Khoja Bedik, who received permission from the Sultan Murad Khan after inviting him to a meal, which was served in fancy and expensive Chinese plates, china rarely found outside his house. After the Sultan finished eating, Bedros told his servants to break the china, so the sultan grew angry and asked why he broke the china. Bedros told him that he did not need them anymore, as he has no one like the Sultan who deserves to eat on them, and that he had especially prepared them for him. The Sultan was happy, so he asked him what he wanted for a reward. Bedros asked to expand the old and small church, as it was not big enough for them, and add a [second floor] building to it, so the Sultan approved.

Usually, Sanos is considered the main sponsor of the church reconstructions of 1616. According to Simeon of Poland, "the builder was Khoja Sanos", and two churches (Church of the Holy Mother of God and Church of the Forty Martyrs) "were renovated and enlarged; domes and arches were added, making them very beautiful and delightful." To the church of the Forty Martyrs were presented Armenian Gospels dated 1615 written by Wardan Lekhatzi (Note: Also spelled Vardan Lehats‘i.) from Lviv and illuminated by Israel of Amit for Khwaja Sanos. Sanos also erected an ornate Armenian cathedral in Erzurum a few years later.

=== Executions ===
The reasons for the executions of both khwajas remain not fully understood. According to Semerdjian, they may be related to the complaints of the European consuls against the brothers and their excessive power. Some authors, such as El-Mudarris & Salmon and de Groot, directly connect the execution of Petik on complaints against him from four consuls — Venetian, English, French and Dutch. According to Masters, Petik was executed "partly due to the complaints sent to the Porte by the European consuls about his rapacious behavior" and Sanos was removed in 1640 and executed "for reasons that are not clear but were obviously serious".

Khwaja Petik was beheaded in the citadel of Aleppo (presumably the order of Murad IV, but according to de Groot, on the order of Grand Vizier). The year of Petik's execution is given by various authors as being 1627 (Masters; Semerdjian), 1632 (Sanjian; Kévonian; Sebouh Aslanian), 1634 (Acharian), or sometime after 1639 (Barsoumian).

Until 1640, Sanos continued to be the chief customs officer of Aleppo. According to Semerdjian, one can speak of the "vastness of Sanos’ personal fortune". Just a year before his execution, in his ledger, dated 2 Muharram 1049, (Note: 4 May 1639.) one can find records of his considerable transactions with foreign merchants. Based on archival materials from Syria, Masters notes that in the same year Sanos collected 7934 ghurush from Europeans and 5406 from caravans, and additionally received 4086 ghurush from stamp (damgha) tax. In addition, Sanos was accused of extortion of several thousand ghurush from English merchants. To replenish his income, Sanos bought a few more positions. According to Semerdjian, having boldly exceeded their authority and being accused of extortion, the brothers "crossed the lines with the Ottoman authorities". In 1640, Sanos was removed from office and executed. After him, the Jew Musa walad Ishaq al-Khakham regained his position as the lucrative position of the chief of customs of Aleppo, which marked the fall of the hegemony of the Armenians in the trade of the Syrian cities.

=== Testimonies of contemporaries ===
Simeon of Poland, who visited Aleppo in 1617, wrote:

This Petik was a known and famous man, for he traveled like a pasha, accompanied by thirty or forty special guards, as well as Janissaries and sipahis. They said that he had [purchased] twenty-four offices, [among them] chief of customs, head of the bazaar, and superintendent of all the inns, baths, and other things.

Khwaja Petik, as was customary, along with other residents of the city, went out to meet the pilgrims from Jerusalem, among whom was Simeon:

Khoja Petik arrived with his two brothers. He was atop a white Arabian horse with a golden saddle and a harness and belt-clasp covered with expensive jewels and pearls. They glittered with gold, gemstones, and expensive cloth. Many slaves and servants, sipahis and Janissaries accompanied him as they would a pasha. Approaching [us], he descended from his horse, fell at the feet of the kat‘oghikos and greeted him. […] That day, Khoja Petik set a great feast and everyone had a good time until evening.

Semerdjian notes that Petik's public wearing of the items described by Simeon ran counter to the Ottoman Empire's sumptuous laws, which forbade non-Muslims from wearing such luxurious clothes, leaving such indulgence only for Muslims.

In one of his letters, Pietro Della Valle wrote about Petik:

Chogia Abedik is very important and respected among them [Armenian Christian gentlemen from Julfa]; this not only means that he is a good Christian and a good friend, as always was with the people of the Franks; but that that he is so religious and pious that it [represents] a mirror of religiosity and Eastern Christianity. This lies in the fact that no matter how many sons a person has, he still spends all his [wealth] on the construction of churches and decorations of [their] walls, silver crosses, cups and other necessary things. And in this new Isfahan Julfa, where they were forced to move after the king destroyed the ancient Armenian Julfa, which was located on the border with Turkey on the Araks River, out of ten churches, one was completely built and maintained by Chogia Abedik with his own money, and in another [church] he contributed most of the funds, although [its construction] is attributed to the names of other [people]. And [still] he helped and helps to create countless works of art in the surrounding villas every day. But I do not want to be silent about another manifestation of his kindness. In the wars that took place in Armenia and Georgia, when [the lives] of many thousands of Christians were turned upside down, and they became slaves, out of the love of God, at his own expense, he redeemed [from slavery] and freed more than four thousand people, diligently looking for them even in distant lands, [he returned] sons to fathers, wives to husbands, and relatives to relatives so that they would not be lost. And in order to do this, not having enough cash and not being able to quickly sell the silks he had, he borrowed them from the Shirvan Khan, who was also the son of a Christian Armenian, giving him as a pledge the silk and what he had owned. This is real mercy, I don't know if more can be done.

The 17th-century Armenian chronicler Hakob Karnetsi (Note: Karnetsi — Armenian: "of Karin" (Erzurum).) described an episode about how Khwaja Sanos, "a pious man from Aleppo", having received an order from Sultan Murad and his Grand vizier Hüsref Pasha, in 1629 went to Erzurum (a hometown of Karnetsi himself), where he assumed the duties of chief customs officer. There he quickly won the recognition of all the pashas and performed his duties until his death. According to Karnetsi, Khwaja Sanos "managed to secure the Sultan an income of 100,000 kurush, in addition to the amounts he gave to the pashas and the needy", and, in addition, he did as "many good deeds" as "only God knows; for example, he arranged the liberation of 1,000 slaves.”

== Assessment and legacy ==
The English priest of the Levant Company, William Biddulph, who visited Aleppo in 1600, and the Portuguese-Jewish traveler Pedro Teixeira, who visited the city five years later, noted the extreme poverty of the local Christians in comparison with the wealth of the Jewish community; but both were surprised by the wealth and influence of the Julfa Armenians in the city. According to Masters, at the end of the 16th and beginning of the 17th centuries an Armenian "cultural renaissance that was unequaled elsewhere among Ottoman Armenians" took place in Aleppo, caused by the patronage of Armenian miniaturists (Note: The Armenian scriptorium has existed in the city since the middle of the 14th century, and many of its artists were invited from Armenia, Cilicia and Europe at the expense of merchants.), architects and artisans by local Armenian merchants. According to Semerdjian: "While both brothers were eventually executed, […] their ascendency, though brief, is historically significant. The wealth they amassed was invested in crucial urban projects […]. In terms of sheer numbers, the [Armenian] community but a fraction of the Christian population in the city, yet in the early seventeenth century it exercised an extraordinary amount of power." Art historian Heghnar Zeitlian Watenpaugh considers the reconstruction of the Church of the Forty Martyrs by Khwaja Sanos as one of the "chronological landmarks" of the revival of Eastern Christian arts in Aleppo in the 17th century. Researcher Kéram Kévonian gives Khwaja Petik the following assessment: "This considerable character can be compared to the greatest khodjas of New Julfa and, more than a century later, were it not for his piety, to a Khodja Wazid, holder of monopolies in Bengal."

Iskender (or Skandar), the son of Sanos, was emin-i gümrük of Aleppo in 1636 and of Baghdad in 1646 (after his father's death).

== Sources ==
- Artinian, Vartan (1988). The Armenian Constitutional System in the Ottoman Empire, 1839—1863: A Study of its Historical Development. Istanbul.
- Aslanian, Sebouh (2011). From the Indian Ocean to the Mediterranean: The Global Trade Networks of Armenian Merchants from New Julfa. University of California Press. pp. 68, 258. ISBN 978-0-520-94757-3.
- Barsoumian, Hagop (2007). "Chapter I: The Predecessors". The Armenian Amira Class of Istanbul. Yerevan: American University of Armenia.
- Bournoutian, George (2007). The Travel Accounts of Simēon of Poland. Costa Mesa, California: Mazda Publishers. ISBN 978-1-56859-161-2.
- Bulut, Mehmet (2002). "The Role of the Ottomans and Dutch in the Commercial Integration between the Levant and Atlantic in the Seventeenth Century". Journal of the Economic and Social History of the Orient. 45 (2): 197–230. doi:10.1163/156852002760247113. JSTOR 3632841.
- Della Valle, Pietro (1843). Viaggi Di Pietro Della Valle, Il Pellegrino (in Italian).
- El-Mudarris, Hussein; Salmon, Olivier (2007). Les relations entre les Pays-Bas et la Syrie ottomane au XVIIe siècle: les 400 ans du Consulat des Pays-Bas à Alep (1607-2007) (in French). Alep: Ray Publishing and Science. p. 27.
- Ganjalyan, Tamara; Kovács, Bálint; Troebst, Stefan [in German], eds. (2018). Armenier im östlichen Europa: Eine Anthologie (in German). Böhlau Verlag Köln. ISBN 9783412513085.
- Griswold, William (1983). The Great Anatolian Rebellion, 1000—1020/1591-1611. Islamkundliche Untersuchungen. K. Schwarz Verlag. ISBN 978-3-922968-34-4.
- de Groot, Alexander H. (1978). The Ottoman Empire and the Dutch Republic: A History of the Earliest Diplomatic Relations, 1610-1630. Nederlands Historisch-Archaeologisch Instituut Leiden/Istanbul. ISBN 978-90-6258-043-9.
- Hacikyan, Agop Jack (2000). The Heritage of Armenian Literature. Detroit: Wayne State University Press. ISBN 978-0-8143-2815-6.
- Kévonian, Kéram (2007). "La société reconstituée". In Chaudhury, Sushil; Kévonian, Kéram (eds.). Les Arméniens dans le commerce asiatique au début de l'ère moderne/Armenians in asian trade in the early modern era (in French). Paris: Éditions de la Maison des sciences de l’homme. ISBN 978-2-7351-1204-3.
- Masters, Bruce (1988). The Origins of Western Economic Dominance in the Middle East: Mercantilism and the Islamic Economy in Aleppo, 1600-1750. New York University Press. pp. 140–141. ISBN 978-0-8147-5435-1.
- Masters, Bruce (2004). Christians and Jews in the Ottoman Arab World: The Roots of Sectarianism. Cambridge University Press. ISBN 978-0-521-00582-1.
- Rogers, J. M. (1983). Islamic Art & Design, 1500-1700. British Museum Publications Limited. ISBN 9780714114286.
- Sanjian, Avedis (1965). The Armenian Communities in Syria under Ottoman Dominion. Harvard University Press. pp. 48–49, 261–262.
- Semerdjian, Elyse (2019). "Armenians in the Production of Urban Space in Early Modern Judayda". In Ade, Mafalda; Winter, Stefan (eds.). Aleppo and its Hinterland in the Ottoman Period / Alep et sa province à l'époque ottomane. Brill. pp. 54–57. ISBN 978-90-04-37902-2.
- Watenpaugh, Heghnar Zeitlian (2004). The Image Of An Ottoman City: Imperial Architecture And Urban Experience In Aleppo In The 16th And 17th Centuries. Leiden; Boston: Brill. ISBN 978-90-47-40422-4.
