= Tigran Honents =

13th-century Armenian trader

Tigran Honents (Armenian: Տիգրան Հոնենց) was a rich Armenian trader of the early 13th century, during the Zakarid period. He is especially known for his dedication of the Church of St Gregory of Tigran Honents in Ani, in Turkey's province of Kars next to the closed border with Armenia in 1215.

== Church of St Gregory of Tigran Honents ==
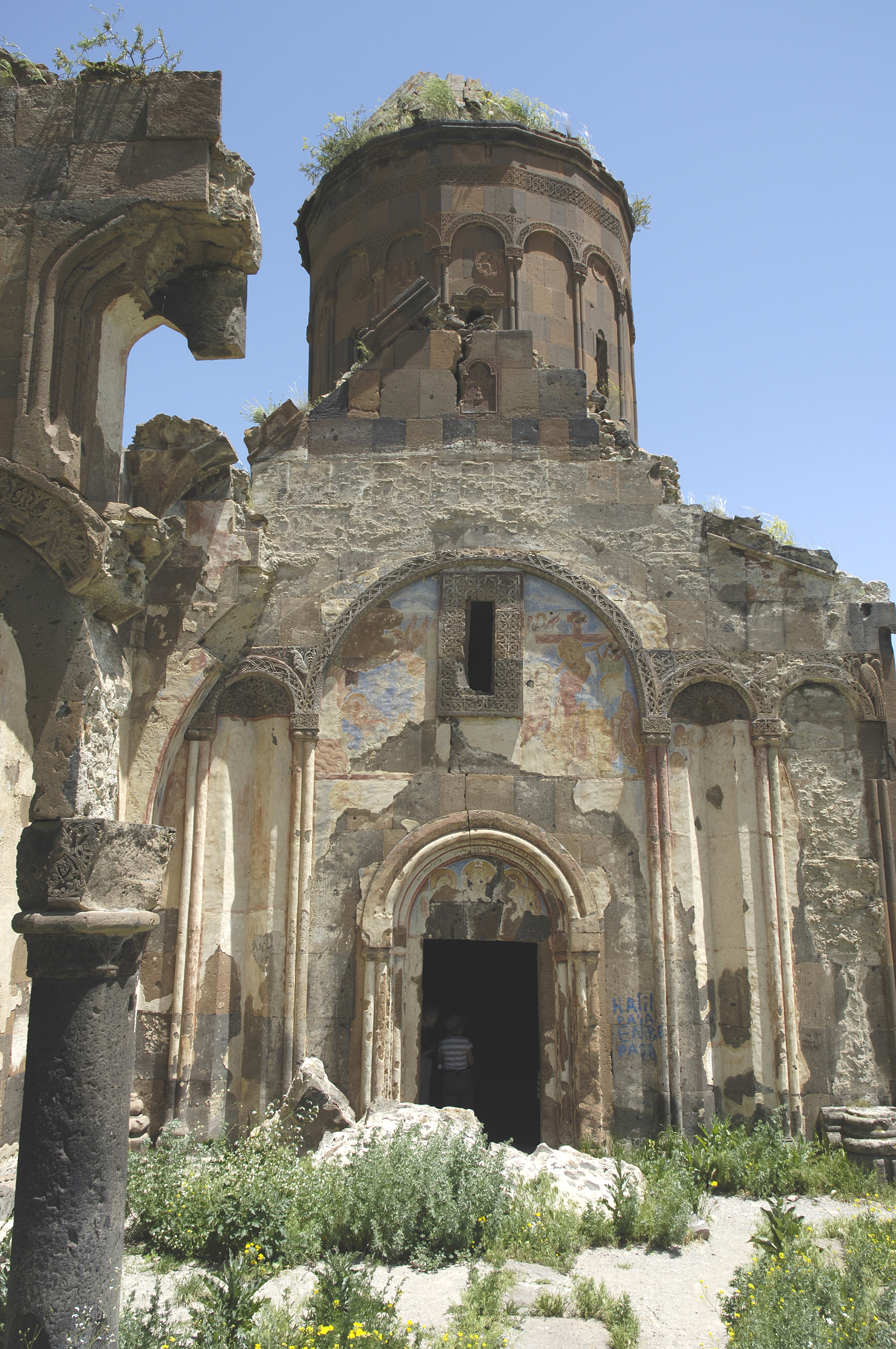
Zakarid church of Tigran Honents, Ani, 1215.

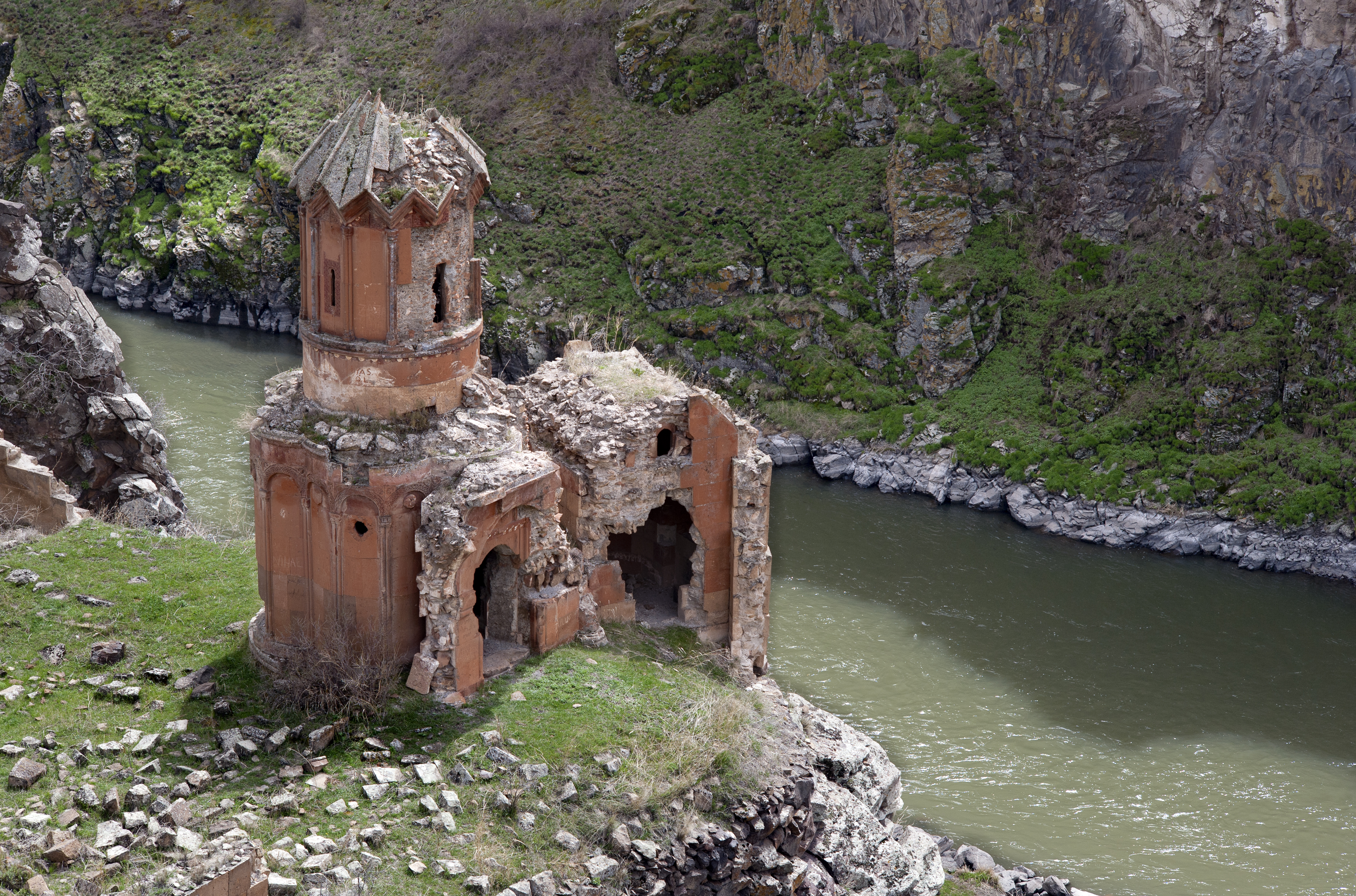
The Monastery of Hripsimian Virgins was another construction dedicated by Tigran Honents.

He made a dedicatory inscription in Armenian on the southern wall of the church of St Gregory of Tigran Honents. The dedication by Tigran Honents shows that he was a Monophysite Christian, as it is made in the name of the "three holy councils and the nine choirs of angels":

In the year 664 [1215], by the mercy of God, when the powerful master of the universe Amirspasalar and Mandaturtukhutsesi Zakare and his son Shahnshah became masters of this city of Ani, I Dikran, servant of God, son of Sulem of the Smpadawrents, of the Honents clan, for the sake of the long life of my lords and their sons built this monastery of St. Krikor, which used to be called "Mother of God of the Chapel", which was at a precipice and with wooded places, which I bought with my legitimate treasure from the hereditary owners, and by means of much labor and treasure I enclosed this church with a wall all around. I built this church in the name of Saint Krikor the Enlightener and adorned it with many ornaments, with symbols of salvation, with holy crosses of gold and silver, and painted images, adorned with gold and silver and jewels and pearl, and with lanterns of gold and silver, and with relics of the holy apostles, of the martyrs, and with part of the dominical cross that has received God, and with all kinds of utensils of gold and silver, and with numerous ornaments. I built all kinds of habitations for the monks and princes, and arranged in them priests who celebrate the mass of the body and blood of Christ to perform mass without obstruction for the long life of my lords Shahnshah and his sons, and for the absolution of my sins; and I gave this gift to this monastery of St. Krikor land which I had bought with treasure and by decision of the masters of the land, and which I had built from the foundation... [list of gifts] Now, if any of the great or small of my [people] or of foreigners attempt to obstruct what is written in my inscription, or usurp things from the products which are established in it, or obstruct the memory of this sinning servant of God for any reason, let such an individual be excluded from the glory of the son of God and inherit the punishment of Cain and Judas on his person and be anathematized by the three holy councils and the nine orders of angels and be responsible for our sins in front of God; and those who are obliging and keep firm are blessed by God. Israegh [Israel] the Scribe.

— Dedication of St Gregory by Tigran Honents.

Tigran Honents is also known to have sponsored the renovation of a staircase in the Cathedral of Ani in 1213, and the building of the Monastery of the Virgins, also at Ani.

== Tomb of Tigran Honents ==
Tigran Honents also had a decorated tomb in the vicinity of Ani (40.507792°N 43.566734°E). The tomb has numerous murals with inscriptions in Armenian.

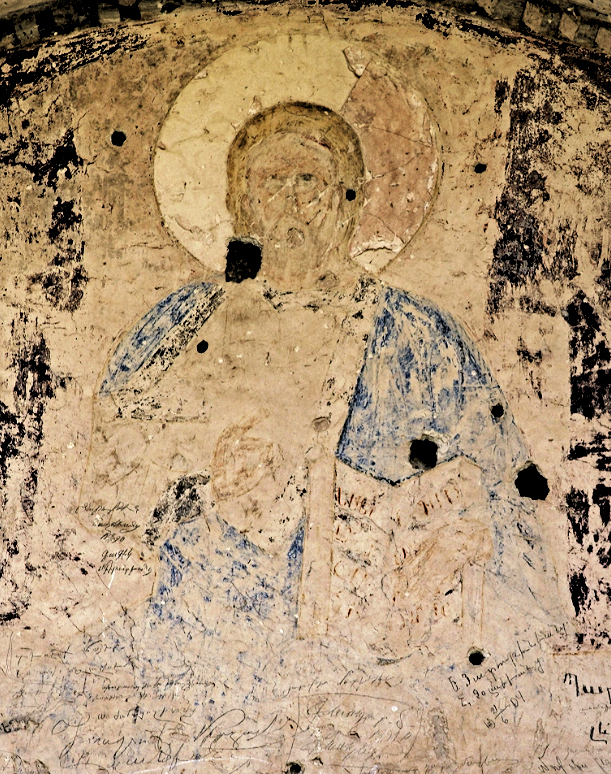
Tomb of Tigran Honents, Christ

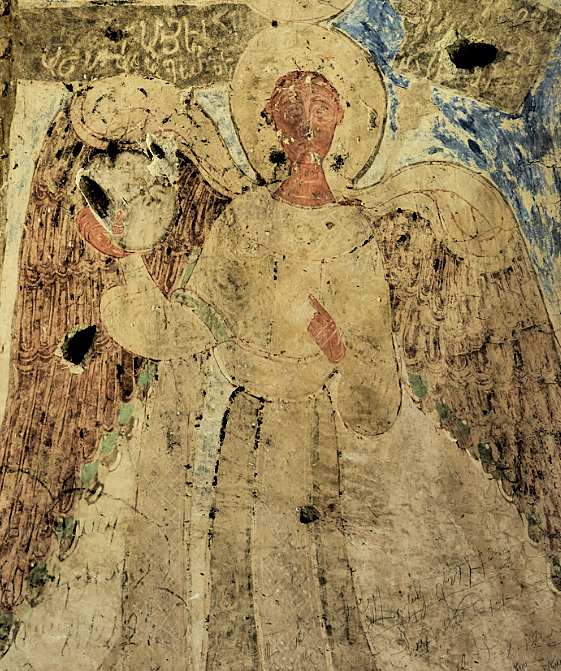
Tomb of Tigran Honents, Angel

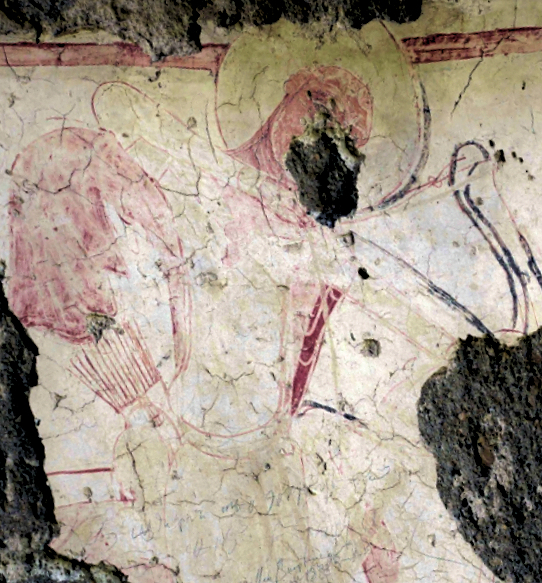
Tomb of Tigran Honents, Bowman

== Sources ==
- Kalas, Veronica (2008). "The Georgian Aspects of Medieval Architecture at Ani in the Thirteenth Century: The Church of Tigran Honents and the Mosque of Minuchir". In Tumanishvili, D. (ed.). Georgian Arts in the Context of European and Asian Cultures. Tbilissi: Georgia Arts and Cultural Center. pp. 211–216.
- Blessing, Patricia (8 March 2017). Architecture and Landscape in Medieval Anatolia, 1100-1500. Edinburgh University Press. pp. 156–159. ISBN 978-1-4744-1130-1.
