= Khoja Wajid =

Bengali-Armenian merchant (died 1759)

- Born: 18th century Bengal Subah, Mughal Empire
- Died: 1759; Murshidabad, Bengal Subah
- Occupations: Merchant, court official
- Employer: Nawab of Bengal
- Known for: Prominent Armenian merchant of Bengal and associate of Nawab Siraj ud-Daulah
- Title: Court merchant and intermediary
- Relatives: Armenian merchant community of Bengal

Khoja Wajid (Note: Khoja was used as a title by wealthy Armenian merchants. Sushil Chaudhury suggests that Wajid/Wazeed may be a form of the Armenian name Avet/Avetik. Some sources call him "Muhammed Wajid" and Dutch records frequently refer to him as a "Moor Merchant." Wajid may have added Muhammed to his name to enhance his business prospects, but, in Chaudhury's view, there is no evidence that he was a Muslim. Bhaswati Bhattacharya, on the other hand, considers it likely that Wajid or his father had converted to Islam at some point.) (also spelled Wazid, Wazeed; d. 1759) was a wealthy Armenian merchant who played a prominent role in the economic and political life of Bengal in the 1740s and 1750s.

== Biography ==
He was the son of Khoja Mahmet Fazel, another notable Armenian merchant. Based in the port town of Hughli, he used his business prowess and influence at the court of the Nawab of Bengal to consolidate his commercial empire, gaining control over the economy of Bihar and establishing highly profitable monopolies over the trade of saltpeter and salt. He also controlled most of the opium trade. After consolidating his control over Bengal's inland trade, he expanded his operations to maritime commerce and acquired a trading fleet which, according to Sushil Chaudhury, "dominated the Asian maritime trade of Hughli." He had extensive business connections with the French, Dutch and English trading companies in India. In the early 1740s, Wajid became the official representative of the Armenian merchants of Bengal at the court of the faujdar of Hughli, later gaining a place at the court of the nawab in Murshidabad. By the early 1750s, he had become a political figure of great influence and a close ally of Nawab Alivardi Khan and his successor Siraj ud-Daulah. When Siraj came into conflict with the English, Wajid was sent as the nawab's emissary to negotiate with the English prior to the Siege of Calcutta. Wajid's commercial interests suffered after the English sacked Hughli, ostensibly in retaliation for Siraj's capture of Calcutta. Seeking to restore his fortunes, Wajid advised the nawab to ally with the French against the British, but fell out of favor at court when this plan failed. He was one of the last to join the conspiracy against Siraj ud-Daulah in May 1757.

Wajid's commercial empire was destroyed after the English victory at Plassey and the establishment of East India Company rule in Bengal. Wajid was targeted by the English, who long resented his monopolistic control of trade in Bengal and suspected him of conspiring with the French. He was deprived of his monopolies and lost his position as a supplier to the European companies. Seeing that he had no chance of restoring his position while Bengal was under British rule, Wajid incited the Dutch to invade Bengal. After the failure of this plot, Wajid was arrested by the order of Governor Robert Clive and poisoned himself in prison. He was succeeded by Khoja Petruse as the leader of the Armenian community in Bengal.
