= Boğaç Ergene =

American historian

Boğaç A. Ergene is an American historian in Islam and world, social theory and cultural studies, currently a professor at University of Vermont, and was previously holder of the Aga Khan Distinguished Professor in Islamic Humanities at Brown University for the 2014 spring semester. He was also co-editor of the Brill Publishers series Ottoman Empire and Its Heritage. He has been collected by libraries.
