= Armenian merchantry =

From antiquity, Armenian merchants have played a pivotal role in transcontinental trade across Eurasia. Positioned strategically along the vital trade route linking Europe and Asia, Armenia's geographical advantage has sustained its centrality of international trade in the economic life of Armenians until the close of the early modern period. Armenians historically served as merchants at the crossroads of Central Asia, India, China, and the Mediterranean, facing persistent attacks from various quarters vying for control over the pivotal trade routes.

Armenians established colonies in various urban centers across Europe and Asia. Simultaneously, they developed necessary infrastructure for successful involvement in long-distance trade.

In the early modern era, Armenians played a highly active and potentially dominant role in overland trade. The significance of the Armenians in long-distance trade across Asia during the 16th to the 18th centuries is a pivotal subject in trade history.

== History ==
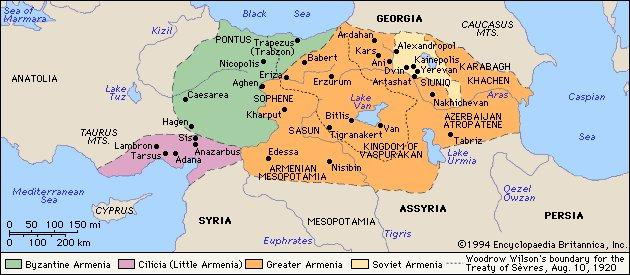
Historical Armenia according to Encyclopædia Britannica. The territory of Greater Armenia is highlighted in orange, Byzantine Armenia in green, Cilician Armenia in purple, and the territory of Soviet Armenia and modern Armenia in yellow.

=== Antiquity ===
According to the Bible, in ancient times the Armenians engaged in commerce with Tyre and other Phoenician cities, trading with horses and mules.

The ascendancy of Classical Greece in the 6th century BCE triggered substantial economic transformations in Armenia, fostering its engagement in international trade. Greek trade routes to India and China traversed Armenia and its territory saw the establishment of new cities inhabited by foreign merchants. A notably impactful outcome of Greek commerce was the introduction of coinage to Armenia, catalyzing the growth of a money-based economy and with it profound economic and social changes. This period witnessed the emergence of urban life, the implementation of fiscal administration and taxation systems, and a burgeoning demand for luxury goods.

Social elite of western Armenia, where Alexander the Great had founded new cities, were Greek-speaking and felt some influence from post-Alexandrian Hellenistic dynasties. Among other things, Greek became the language of trade. Road system was introduced to Armenia by Hellenistic rulers. To facilitate travel of merchants and troops between the Mediterranean and Central Asia, roads were constructed throughout Anatolia and Armenia and formerly isolated towns gained accessibility and established closer connections with the broader region.

In 176 BCE, King Artaxias I of Armenia founded Artashat (Artaxata) as the capital of Armenia. The city becomes the largest in Armenia and its principal commercial center. Following its reconstruction in 166 BCE after being sacked by the Romans, Artashat was recognized through a treaty between Rome and Iran as an official hub for international trade between the two empires. Subsequently, the city prospers as a flourishing center for commerce and industry.

=== Middle Ages ===
Throughout Byzantine, Persian, and Arab rule, Armenia remained a pivotal trade conduit between East and West.

==== Bagratid period ====
Armenia regained its independence from the Arabs as a state in the late 9th century under Bagratuni dynasty. It retained a symbolic allegiance through the tribute payment to the caliph, but as Armenia's economy rapidly recuperated, it wasn't a financial burden anymore. Armenian society was significantly influenced by achievements yielded by the rapid economic progress of Bagratid Armenia. Central to these accomplishments was the reurbanization of Armenia, marked by growth and prosperity in cities. This period was characterized by wealth, expanded commerce and the emergence of new classes of men whose livelihoods were based not in rural areas but in the cities on the international trade routes intersecting Armenia. The new wealth was directed towards fortifying and embellishing the major Armenian cities, especially the new capital and economic hub, Ani.

==== Mongol period ====
Although the Mongol invasion in the 13th century caused significant human and property losses in Armenia and the subsequent Mongol rule over Armenia was characterized by high taxes leading to social unrest and violent uprisings, the period saw the continuation of trade prosperity. Armenia served as an important trade crossroads, through which merchants were allowed secure passage to India and China through Central Asia. Merchants enjoyed secure passage through the country, and Armenians established trading posts in Trebizond, Tabriz, Soltaniyeh, Bukhara, and Beijing.

==== Cilician period ====
Since the second half of 11th century displaced from their homeland by the Seljuk invasions, Armenians migrated into Cilicia, where they formed a new Armenian state.

Thriving commerce of Armenian Kingdom of Cilicia marked one of the most economically prosperous periods in Armenian history. Its Mediterranean coastal position between Asia and Europe gave rise to ports and commercial establishments that were instrumental in opening up trade connections between Asia and Europe. Cilician Armenia became a crucial crossing point for trade caravans from both continents. With it Armenians found themselves at the connection of the two powerful economic forces of the time: the Western maritime Italians and the Mongol horsemen. The former controlled Mediterranean trade and the latter controlled almost all of Asia. Armenian Cilicia, being the only Mediterranean coastal country on friendly terms with both of them, was the place where these two immense commercial zones were coming together.

In his writings Marco Polo, the 13th-century Venetian merchant and explorer, portrayed the Cilician port of Ayas as a bustling trading center. Cilician merchants engaged in the trade of sugar, cotton, raisins, carpets, dyes, textiles, wines, salt, iron, and timber. The spice industry flourished, proving highly lucrative. European traders were granted permission to establish colonies in Sis, Misis, and Tarsus; Venetian and Genoese merchants were the majority of colonists in these thriving settlements.

King Hethum I, concluding an alliance with the Mongols, initiated an era marked by great prosperity and effective governance "that the Armenians had not known for over 200 years". Armenians became part of the Mediterranean community, participating in its commerce, culture and social values.

The wealth of its merchants was a part of the Cilician state's success and attracted the attention of the Egyptian Mamluks that sought to control Mediterranean trade. Mamluks went to war against Cilician Armenia and after more than a hundred years seized in 1375 the kingdom's capital, city of Sis. Following this year the remaining Armenian merchants and nobility of Cilicia departed from the region. Tens of thousands of Cilician Armenians moved to Cyprus, Rhodes, Crete, Smyrna, and other places of the Byzantine Empire.

=== Early modern period ===
During the 16th to 18th centuries, Armenian merchants played a vital role in Eurasian overland trade. European goods flowed from the Mediterranean and Black Sea ports, moving eastward near or through historical Armenia to reach the Caspian Sea's southern borders. From there, Armenian merchants operated on three key overland trade routes of those times: one to Central Asia and China, another to India and Southeast Asia, and a third northward to Russia. While active in maritime trade from the east coast of Africa to the Philippines, Armenian involvement was more pronounced in overland routes.

The Armenians' active participation in global trade during the 17th and 18th centuries resulted in the establishment of notable Armenian settlements in Europe, India and in Istanbul and other Ottoman port cities.

Malachy Postlethwayt in the 18th century wrote:

They [the Armenian merchants] are not only masters of the trade of the whole of the Levant, but have also a great share in that of the most considerable towns in Europe; for it is very common to meet with some Armenians at Leghorn, at Venice, in England, and in Holland; whilst on the other side they travel into the dominions of the Grand Mogul, Siam, Java, the Philippine islands, and over all the east.

==== Julfans ====
===== Old Julfa =====
Julfa was a very old Armenian village on the Arax River in historical Armenian province of Nakhijevan. Scant historical information exists about the village until 1500, but in the 16th century it became a commercial center for the Levantine raw silk trade. Political disturbances in Mongol- and Turkmen-controlled Armenia of the 14th and 15th centuries physically and economically devastated the country. Muslim tribal lords gradually confiscated ancestral lands of Armenian landlords of remaining old Armenian principalities and oppressed them. The majority of Armenians were forced to flee the region for safer areas, with some of them settling along trade routes to indulge in commerce. Julfa attracted large numbers of new settlers since it was perfectly situated near an international trade route connecting Tabriz, Yerevan, Erzurum, and Tbilisi. The village experienced the demographic growth and its rise followed.

The 16th-century prosperity of Julfa, located close to the silk-producing regions of Karabakh, Shirvan, Gilan, and Mazandaran, was closely linked to the increasing European demand for raw silk, propelling the growth of the Levantine silk trade. Armenians became strongly immersed in the traffic of raw silk to paramount silk markets of the 16th century, Aleppo and Bursa, and trade contacts with Europe had been established by Julfa's merchants by the end of the 16th century.

The Safavid Persia fought wars with the Ottoman Empire throughout the 16th century and Armenia, divided between them, for the larger part of the century served as their battleground. Although Armenian towns and villages often suffered from devastating scorched-earth policies employed by both the Safavids and the Ottomans, there is little evidence indicating physical hardship endured by Julfa's population. In contrast to other Armenian cities, Julfa was largely spared looting and destruction, whether because of the city's too remote location from the actual battlefields or because of affordability of its citizens to pay large ransoms.

In 1545, Shah Tahmasp I (r. 1524–1576) issued a farman designating the city of Julfa as a waqf of the nearby St. Stephen's Monastery. The privileged status of a crown domain (ḵāṣṣa) that the city enjoyed did so that its citizens paid taxes not to the administration (divān) but directly to royal treasury and, as was common in other crown domains, in Julfa the tax collection right evidently was leased to a local headman or wealthy merchant. Thus Julfans were protected from the arbitrary interference of regular state tax collectors.

===== New Julfa =====
According to Sushil Chaudhury, "[i]t should be noted that though the Armenians were involved in commerce for centuries, it was only with the emergence of New Julfa as the nucleus of the Armenian trading networks that they were organized as one of the most dominant groups in the long-distance trade in the Eurasian continuum in the early modern era."

The establishment of New Julfa in the early 17th century marked an unplanned yet significant chapter in the history of Armenian merchantry. During the 16th century, historical Armenia became ensnared in the power struggles between the Ottomans and Persians. Despite the damage suffered by Armenians, they managed to maintain their robust engagement in commercial endeavors. In 1604, Shah Abbas I (r. 1588–1629) conquered the Ottoman Transcaucasian domains and forcibly deported the Armenians of Eastern Armenia to inner Persia. Employing a crafty maneuver, Shah Abbas I resettled the deported Armenian peasants in the silk-producing regions of Gilan and Mazandaran while the Armenian professional merchants and artisans were moved to outskirts of the Persian capital, Isfahan, forming a burgeoning township renowned as New Julfa (Nor Jugha) after their hometown, Julfa (Jugha) on the Arax River.

The forced deportation of the Armenians and their resettlement in Persia formed a deliberate economic and political strategy aimed at consolidating Shah's power. Recognizing Armenian expertise in commerce, the Shah enlisted their vast capital, global contacts, and market knowledge to advance Persia's foreign trade in raw silk. The Armenians successfully expanded trade routes, developed new markets, and contributed significantly to the economic and military aspects of 17th-century Persia. The Armenian merchants of New Julfa were the main sources of the very substantial importation of silver into the Persian realm in exchange for Iran's raw silk. This greatly contributed to Shah Abbas I's military restructuring efforts and the establishment of a robust and stable state.

According to Arakel of Tabriz, Shah Abbas I is said to have stated to his Muslim subjects:

Do not be offended or blame me for the little and frivolous love I express for them [the Armenians]. After spending fortunes, with great effort and many plots, I was able to transfer them to this country, not for their own sake, but for our own benefit, so that our country may develop and our nation may grow.

In Safavid Iran, New Julfa was almost exclusively Armenian city. New Julfan Armenians were exceedingly influential in the economy of the Safavid Empire. Armenians, benefiting from granted to them interest-free loans and support for business ventures, monopolized the silk industry and turned New Julfa into a key Iranian trading hub. They managed a significant portion of Iran's trade with Europe, India, and Russia.

The economic affluence of Armenians in Persia, particularly in New Julfa, ceased with the Afghan invasion of Persia in 1722. This incursion inflicted significant casualties and losses on New Julfan Armenians, compelling numerous prominent merchant families to migrate to India, Russia, and various regions in Europe.

===== Organizational structure =====
New Julfa emerged as the epicenter of Persia's silk trade, orchestrating an extensive commercial network spanning from western Europe to India and Southeast Asia. In the 17th century, the intricate trading system revolved around primarily several very rich and powerful New Julfan merchant families, commonly referred to as Khojas or sometime Aghas. There were around twenty such families that were serving as both business financiers and entrepreneurs directed well-organized trading houses. Acting on a global scale, they deployed factors to various regions, diligently managing ventures to optimize profits. Renowned for their thrift and economy, these factors played a crucial role in maintaining high general profits while minimizing operational costs, thereby contributing to the prosperity of New Julfa's silk trade.

Armenian trading houses, primarily located in New Julfa, operated as networks or alliances centered on influential merchant families and their heads, the Khojas. These Khojas, functioning as both financiers and entrepreneurs, diverged from the model of single, large, hierarchically organized joint-stock companies prevalent among Northern Europeans. This unique structure allowed Armenian trading houses to circumvent the relatively rigid and costly operations pursued by the European companies. Regardless of their location, Armenian merchants maintained regular contact with the central hub of the community in New Julfa.

=== Ottoman Empire ===
While the majority of Armenians in Ottoman Empire were poor peasants, a minority achieved prosperity as merchants and artisans. Armenians already had established notable settlements in Istanbul and other Ottoman port cities in the 17th and 18th centuries due to their active participation in global trade. Despite the Muslim dominance in Ottoman society, a limited number of Armenian families managed to secure influential positions in banking, commerce, and government. Nevertheless, the elevated status and influence of the educated and cosmopolitan Armenian elite generated resentment and suspicion among the Muslim populace.

In the major Ottoman cities the overwhelming majority of the Armenian populace comprised merchants and artisans. They played a significant role in the internal economy of the Ottoman Empire. The Armenians participated in almost every business, yet they held near-total monopoly in specific trades. Armenian merchants within the dominion of the Ottoman Empire had control over much of the trade of the Middle East and Central Asia. The secular Armenian community, notably in Aleppo, derived much of its economic and social power from its pivotal involvement in commerce and finance. The most outstanding Armenian merchant magnates in Aleppo during the late 16th and early 17th centuries were Khwaja Petik Chelebi, the richest merchant in the city, and his brother Khwaja Sanos Chelebi, both from Old Julfa, who monopolized Aleppine silk trade and were important patrons of the Armenians.

==== Constantinople (Istanbul) ====
After the capture of Constantinople in 1453, a substantial exodus of Greek merchants and businessmen occurred. In an effort to rebuild and repopulate his new capital, Mehmed the Conqueror sought to replace them with Armenian and Jewish merchants and tradesmen, with numerous proficient Armenians forcibly relocated to Ottoman Constantinople from Akn, Cilicia, Arapkir, Bursa, and Amasya. Mehmed's successors continued to compulsory import Armenians to the city from areas such as Theodocia (1493), Tavriz (1514), Naxijevan (1577), and others. Armenian merchants from New Julfa also migrated to Istanbul, Smyrna, and other Ottoman cities.

Armenian merchants and artisans of Constantinople played an important role in the economy of the Ottoman Empire. Engaged in diverse trades, they held a virtual monopoly in jewelry manufacturing. During Mehmed's reign, a significant presence of Armenian bakers is documented, with their own quarters in Galata and Hasköy.

=== Russian Empire ===
In the 16th century, Armenian merchants of Transcaucasia were granted the right to free trade commerce with Russia via the city of Astrakhan where a large Armenian colony was established.

In the 19th century, under Russian imperial control, commercial activity experienced a resurgence in Eastern Armenia. The Armenian bourgeoisie directed its capital towards investment in trade and industrial ventures in Baku, Tiflis, Batum, and various other cities within the Russian Empire.

== Success ==
Questions regarding the factors behind the extraordinary success of the Armenians in the early modern era long-distance trade attracted the attention of such famous economic historians as Fernand Braudel and Philip D. Curtin. Research by Vahé Baladouni and Margaret Makepeace (1998) proposes that the Armenians' prosperity can be primarily attributed to their "organizational form or arrangements." The success of Armenian enterprises, widely dispersed yet closely interconnected, rested on an "ethos of trust." This trust, functioning as a form of human capital, was cultivated through the Armenians' "collective socio-political experiences" spanning centuries. The organizational structure, grounded in family ties and trust among compatriots, provided Armenian merchants with two crucial advantages—cost savings and innovative practices. The Armenians' ability to establish networks of trust, characterized by shared information and mutual support, stemmed from their distinct ethnic and religious minority status. While acknowledging that other diaspora communities, particularly the Jews, possessed similar characteristics, it is suggested by Chaudhury that Armenians, possibly due to their advancements in these aspects, experienced a more pronounced success compared to others during the early modern era.

According to Kirti N. Chaudhuri, Armenian traders were a group of highly skilled arbitrage dealers, compelled by historical circumstances to engage in flexible and geographically mobile commerce, with a profit-driven readiness to trade in various commodities and their indifferent approach to residence across locations such as Isfahan, Madras, Surat, or Hughli due to the uncertainties of their political and national status.

== Comments from famous merchants and travelers ==
Jean-Baptiste Tavernier wrote around the mid-18th century that the "Armenians were even better suited for commerce that they live with great economy and are very thrifty... either by virtue or because of avarice".

John Fryer in 1698 wrote:

On which account it is the Armenians being skilled in all the intricacies and subtleties of trade at home, and travelling with these into the remotest kingdoms, become by their own Industry, and by becoming Factors of their own Kindreds Honesty, the Wealthiest men [...]. They are kind of privateer in Trade, no Purchase, no Pay: they enter the theatre of commerce by means of some Benefactor, whose money they adventure upon, and on Return, a quarter part of the gain is their own: from such beginnings do they raise sometimes great Fortunes, for themselves and (their) Masters

== See also ==
- Armenian diaspora
- Economy of Armenia
- History of Armenia

== Sources ==
- Adalian, Rouben Paul (2010). Historical Dictionary of Armenia. Scarecrow Press. ISBN 9780810874503.
- Artinian, Vartan (1988). The Armenian Constitutional System in the Ottoman Empire, 1839–1863: A Study of its Historical Development. Istanbul: Self published.
- Aslanian, Sebouh (2011). From the Indian Ocean to the Mediterranean: The Global Trade Networks of Armenian Merchants from New Julfa. University of California Press. ISBN 978-0-520-94757-3.
- Chaudhury, Sushil (2007). "Introduction". In Chaudhury, Sushil; Kévonian, Kéram (eds.). Les Arméniens dans le commerce asiatique au début de l'ère moderne/Armenians in asian trade in the early modern era. Paris: Éditions de la Maison des sciences de l’homme. pp. 3–18. ISBN 9782735112043.
- Northrup, Cynthia Clark, ed. (2015). Encyclopedia of World Trade: From Ancient Times to the Present. Taylor & Francis. ISBN 9781317471530.
- Stokes, Jamie (2009). "Armenians". In Stokes, Jamie (ed.). Encyclopedia of the Peoples of Africa and the Middle East. Historical consultants: Gorman, Anthony; Newman, Andrew. New York: Facts on File. pp. 52–66. ISBN 9781438126760.
- Sanjian, Avedis (1965). The Armenian Communities in Syria under Ottoman Dominion. Harvard University Press.
