= New Julfa =

Armenian quarter of Isfahan, Iran

New Julfa Նոր Ջուղա
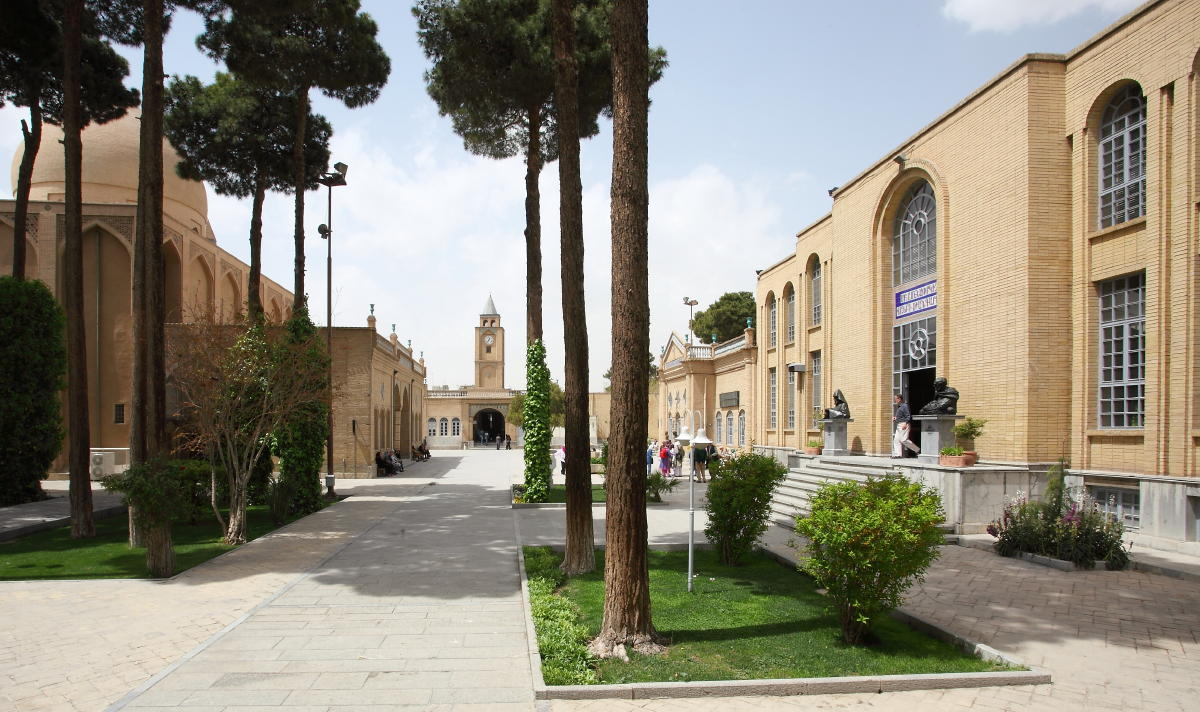
- Courtyard of the Holy Savior Cathedral, and the Museum of Khachatur Kesaratsi
- Interactive map of New Julfa
- Coordinates: 32°38′10.79″N 51°39′20.55″E
- Country: Iran
- Province: Isfahan Province
- Counties: Isfahan County
- City: Isfahan
- District: District 5 (Isfahan)
- Settled: early 17th century

New Julfa (Persian: نو جلفا, Now Jolfā, or جلفای نو, Jolfâ-ye Now; Armenian: Նոր Ջուղա, Nor Jugha) is the Armenian quarter of Isfahan, Iran, located along the south bank of the Zayanderud.

Established and named after the older city of Julfa in the early 17th century (now divided as Jolfa, Iran and Julfa, Azerbaijan), it is still one of the oldest and largest Armenian quarters in the world (hy).

== History ==
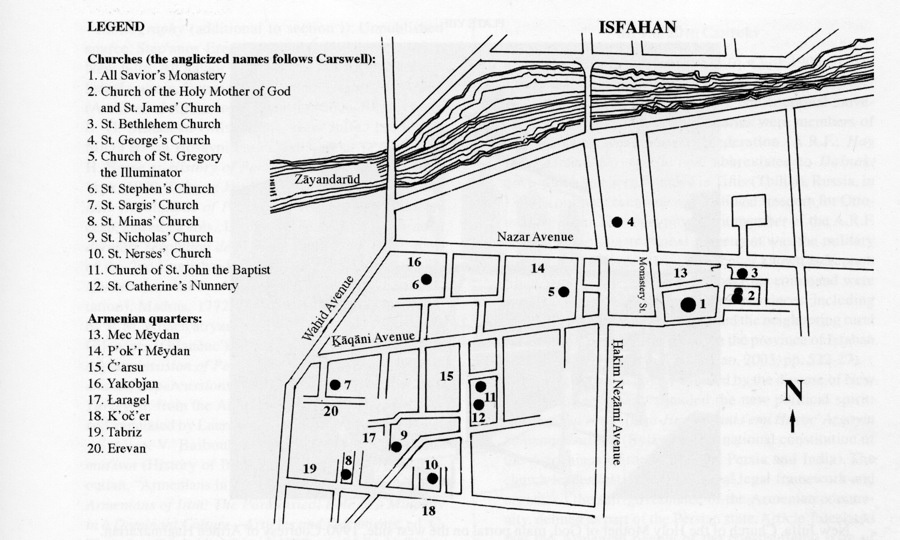
Map of New Julfa (planimetry)

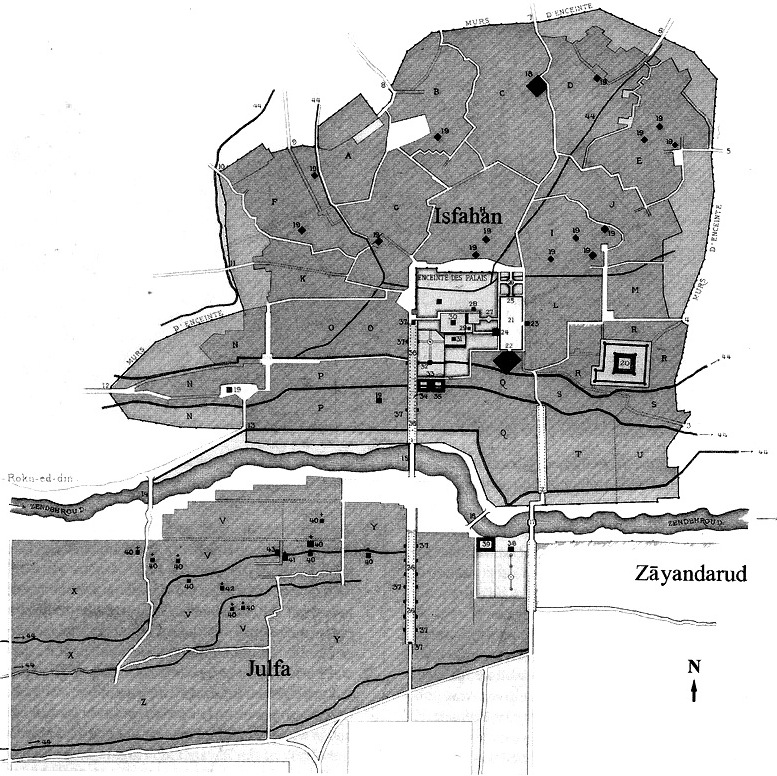
Map of New Julfa and Isfahan

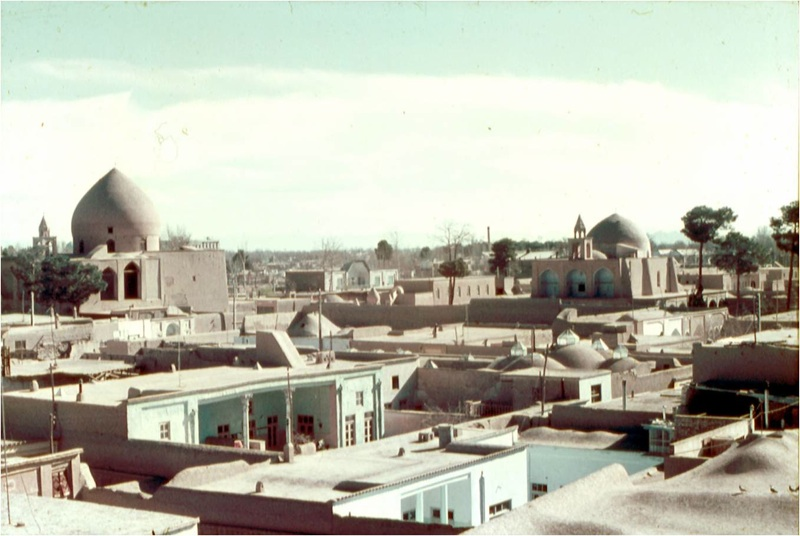
View of New Julfa

New Julfa was established in 1606 as an Armenian quarter by the mandate of Abbas the Great, shah of Safavid Iran. Over 150,000 Armenians were forcibly moved there from Julfa (also known as Jugha or Juła, and now as Old Julfa) (hy) (hy). Iranian sources state that the Armenians came to Iran fleeing the Ottoman Empire's persecution. Nevertheless, historical records indicate that the residents of Julfa were treated well by Shah Abbas in the hopes that their resettlement in Isfahan would benefit Iran due to their knowledge of the silk trade. Beginning in the early 1600s, New Julfa became home to a very small community of merchants and artisans as well as to a small group of Catholic missionary priests who served the Christian community. Among the residents of New Julfa was the Geneva clockmaker, Jacques Rousseau (1683-1753), who was the uncle of the philosopher Jean-Jacques Rousseau (1712-1778).

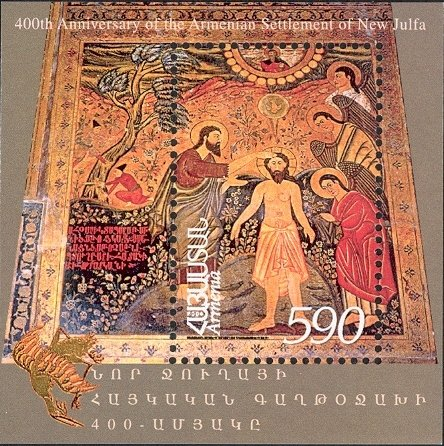
Armenian Stamp commemorating 400th anniversary of the Armenian aettlement of New Julfa

The New Julfa dialect (hy) (hy) is a distinct form of Eastern Armenian spoken largely in Iran and Southern California. "This variety or lect is called “Persian Armenian” [pɒɻskɒhɒjeɻen] or “Iranian Armenian” [iɻɒnɒhɒjeɻen] by members of the community."

New Julfa is still an Armenian-populated area with an Armenian school and sixteen churches, including Vank Cathedral. Armenians in New Julfa observe Iranian law concerning clothing, but retain a distinct Armenian language, identity, cuisine, and culture, which the Iranian government protects.

=== Origins and Trade ===
Since its foundation, New Julfa was administered by the Armenian noble house of Lazaryan, which relocated to Imperial Russia after Nader Shah's death in 1747. One of its members, Ivan Lazarevich Lazarev, became a court banker to Catherine the Great and was made an Imperial Count in 1788. His brother established the Lazarev Institute of Oriental Languages in Moscow.

In 1947, the historian Fernand Braudel wrote that the Armenians had a trade network that stretched from Amsterdam to Manila in the Philippines. Many scholars in Armenia have done pioneering work on this network in the 1960s, 70s, and 80s. Levon Khachikyan and Sushanik Khachikyan have edited and published several New Julfan account books. Over the next few centuries, New Julfa became the hub of "one of the greatest trade networks of the early modern era," and as far west as Cádiz, London, and Amsterdam, with a few merchants traveling across the Atlantic or Pacific to Acapulco or Mexico City.

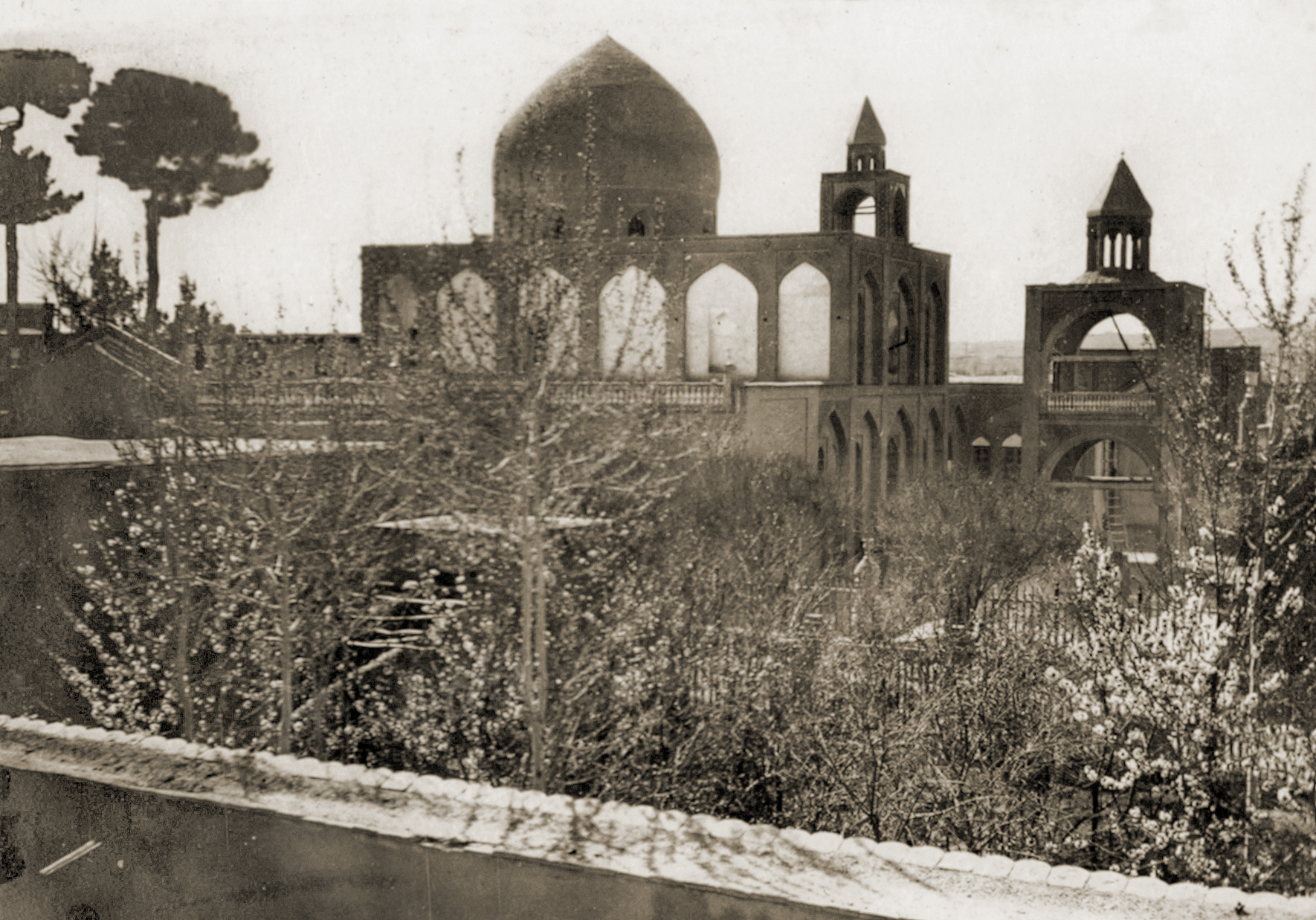
An old photograph of Vank Cathedral from the 1930s

A significant majority of Armenian trading families were based in New Julfa (hy). Due to their dispersal, many families that were originally from the older city of Julfa created a main settlement in Bengal expanding the trade network based in New Julfa. However, Some scholars argue that Surat, Bengal, and Hooghly were independent nodes and that the central control of New Julfa was not as important to their thriving Indian Ocean trade. Many New Julfan Armenians later settled in Manila, Hong Kong, and also in Australia. Their networks have been studied based on Armenian sources. Some also settled in Singapore, where Armenians from New Julfa became the mainstay of the Armenian community in the country. Most were traders, but perhaps better known were the Sarkies Brothers, who founded Singapore's Raffles Hotel in 1887.

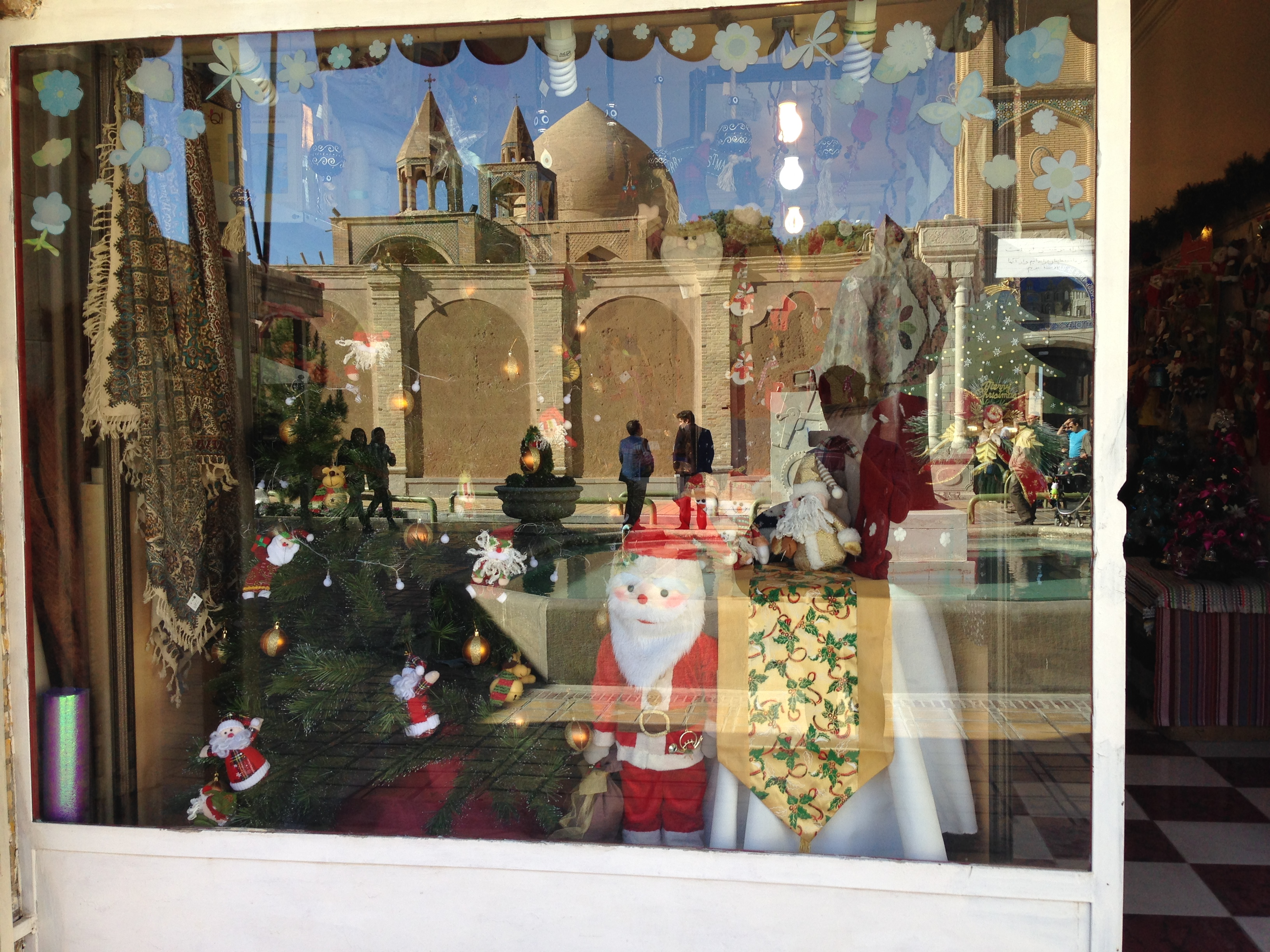
A Christmas shop in New Julfa

According to David Petrosyan of the Central Asia-Caucasus Institute, New Julfa had 10,000–12,000 Armenian inhabitants in 1998. As of today, it is still one of the world's largest ethnic Armenian quarters.

== Sites ==
=== Churches ===
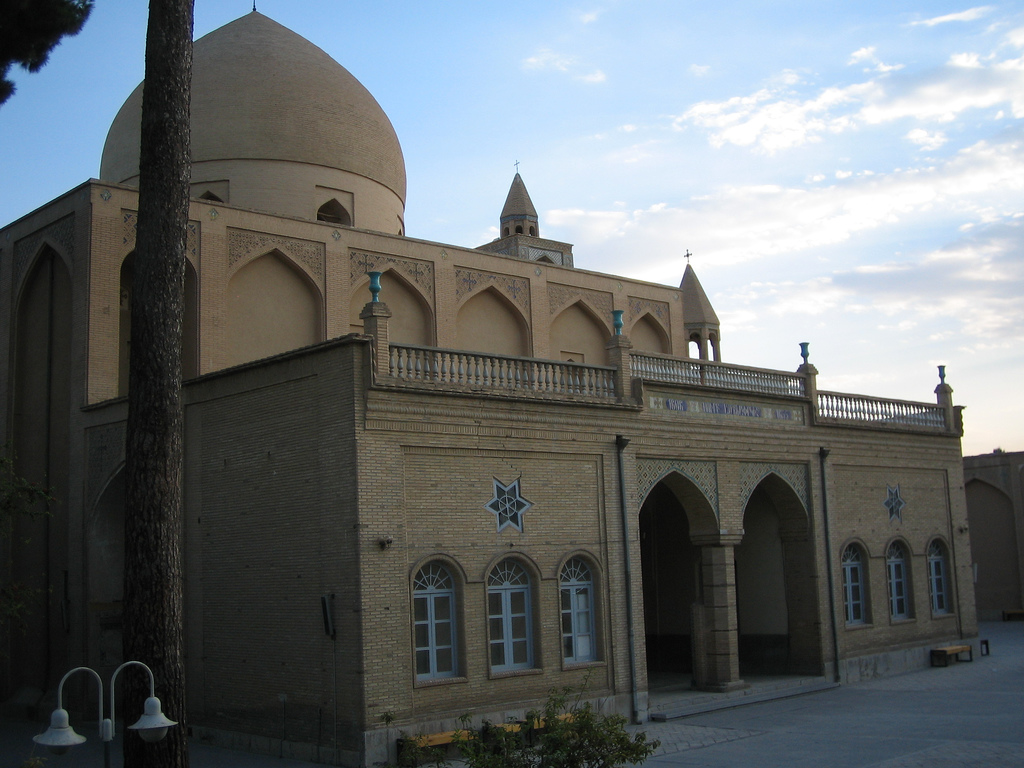
Holy Savior Cathedral, New Julfa

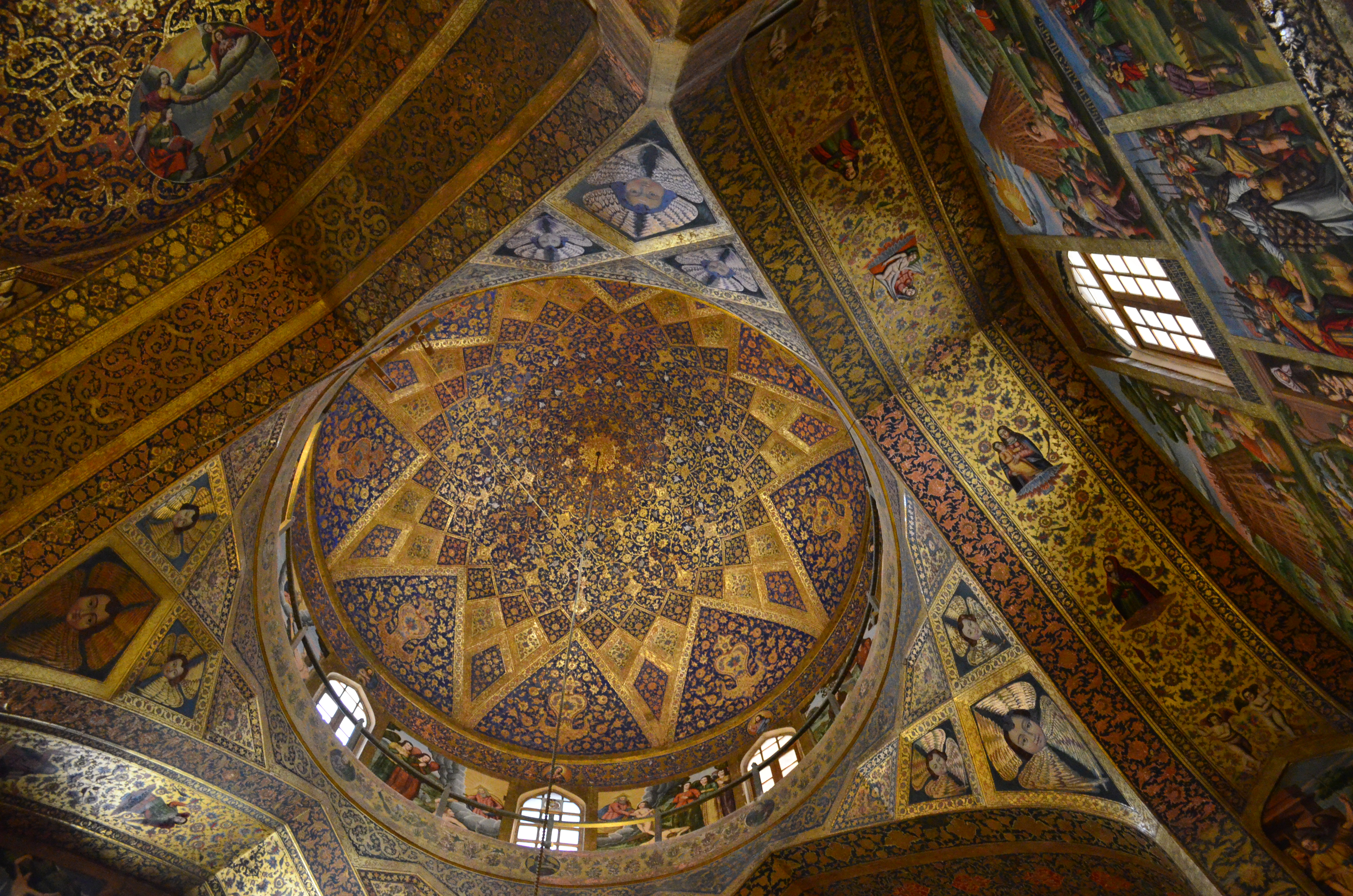
Ceiling of the Holy Savior Cathedral

==== Armenian Apostolic ====
- Holy Savior Cathedral (Surp Amenaprgich, commonly known as the Vank) and Armenian Apostolic Diocese of Persia and India – 1655
- Saint Jacob Church (Surp Hakop Mdzbena Hayrapet) – 1607
- Saint George Church (Surp Gevork) – 1611
- Holy Mother of God Church (Surp Asdvadzadzin) – 1613
- Saint Stephen Church (Surp Stepanos Nakhavga) – 1614
- Saint John the Baptist Church (Surp Hovannes Mgrditch) – 1621
- Saint Catherine Convent (Surp Katarine) – 1623
- Holy Bethlehem Church (Surp Betłehem) – 1628
- Saint Nicholas Church (Surp Nikołayos Hayrapet) – 1630
- Saint Gregory the Illuminator Church (Surp Grigor Lusavoritch) – 1633
- Saint Sarkis Church (Surp Sarkis) – 1659
- Saint Minas Church (Surp Minas) – 1659
- Saint Nerses Church (Surp Nerses Medz) – 1666

==== Roman Catholic ====
- Cathedral of Our Lady of the Rosary (Dominicans) – 1681/1705

==== Protestant ====
- Saint Paul Church – 1875
- Seventh-day Adventist – 1957
- Assemblies of God – 1965

=== Museums ===
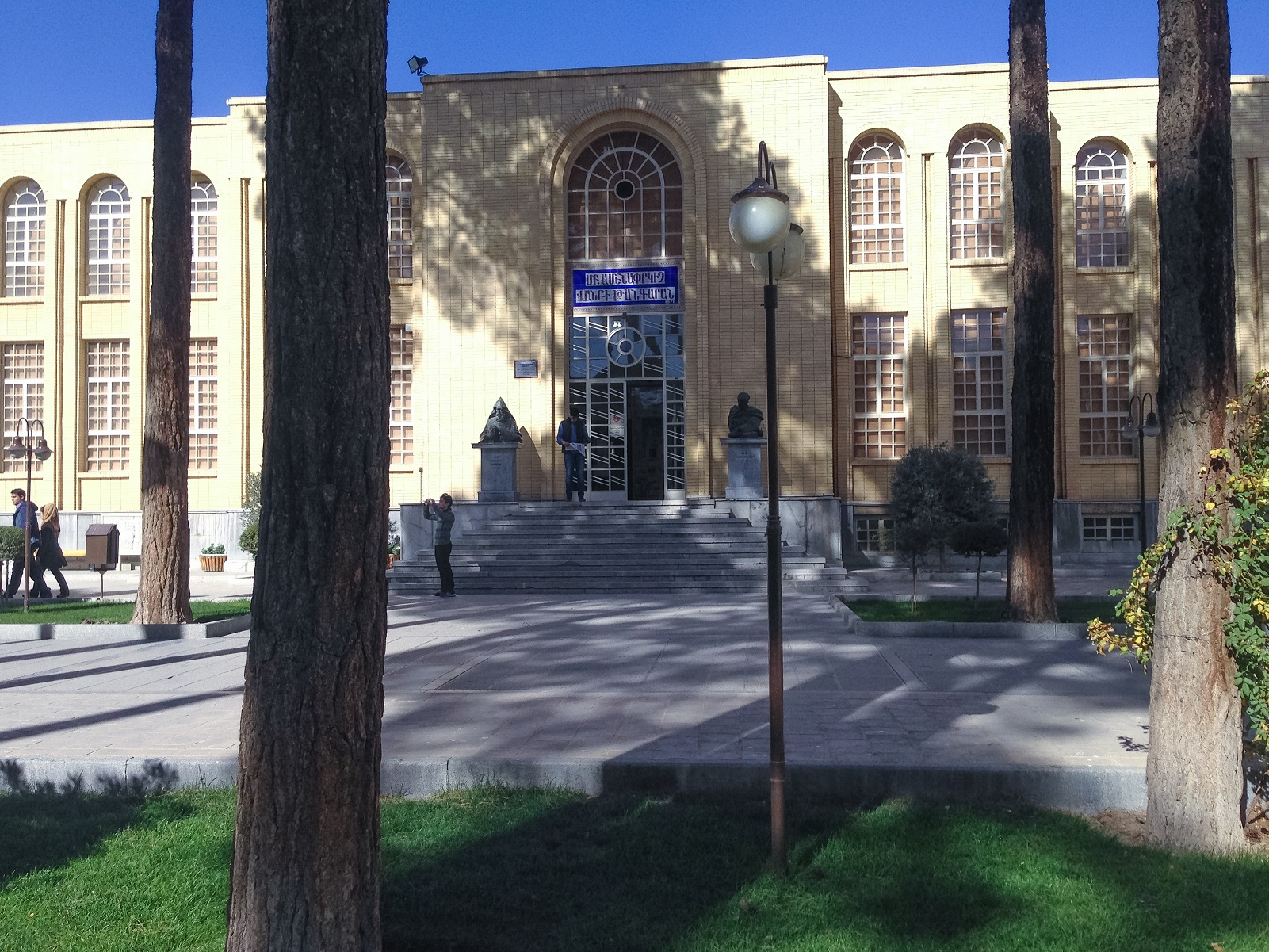
Museum of Khachatur Kesaratsi

- The Museum of Khachatur Kesaratsi (fa), in the compound of the Holy Savior Cathedral – 1905
- Armenian Ethnographical Museum of New Julfa (fa) - 2019
- Museum of Armenian Music in New Julfa (fa) - 2021

=== Schools ===
- Samian (1831–1853) (hy)
- Katarinyan (1858–now) (hy)
- Azgayin Kntronakan (1880–now) (hy)
- Gevorg Kananyan (1905–now) (hy)

=== Historic Houses ===
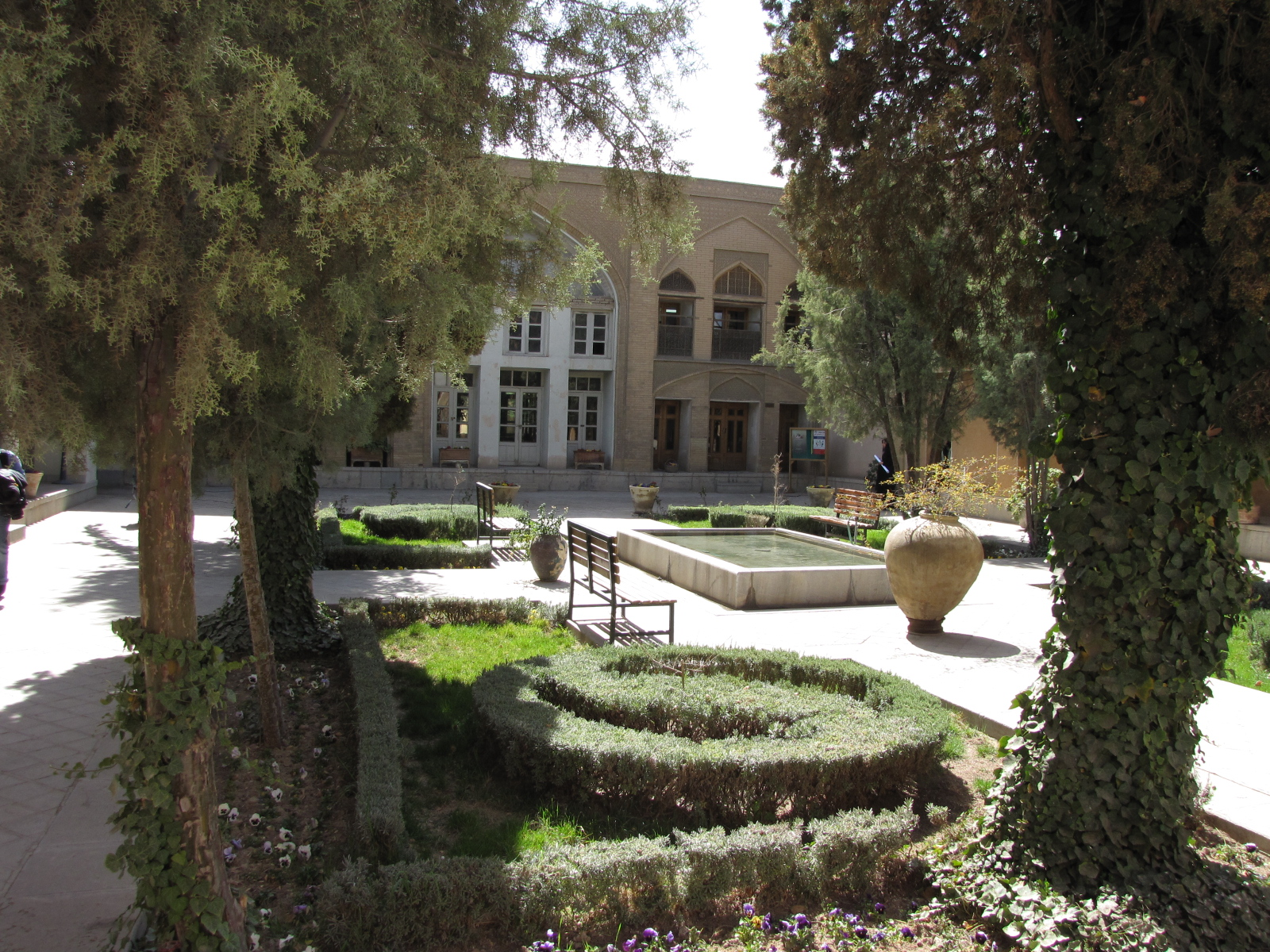
Martha Peters House

- House of Aro Martirossian (fa)
- House of Garegin (fa)
- House of Hovsep Amirkhan (fa)
- House of Khvajeh Petros (hy)
- House of Martha Peters (fa)
- House of Martirossian (fa)
- House of Simon (fa)
- House of Sukiasian (fa)

=== Fire Temple ===
- Zoroastrian Fire Temple (Darb-e Mehr of Gowhar and Mehraban) (fa)

== Notable people ==
The statues at the entrance of the Museum of Khachatur Kesaratsi

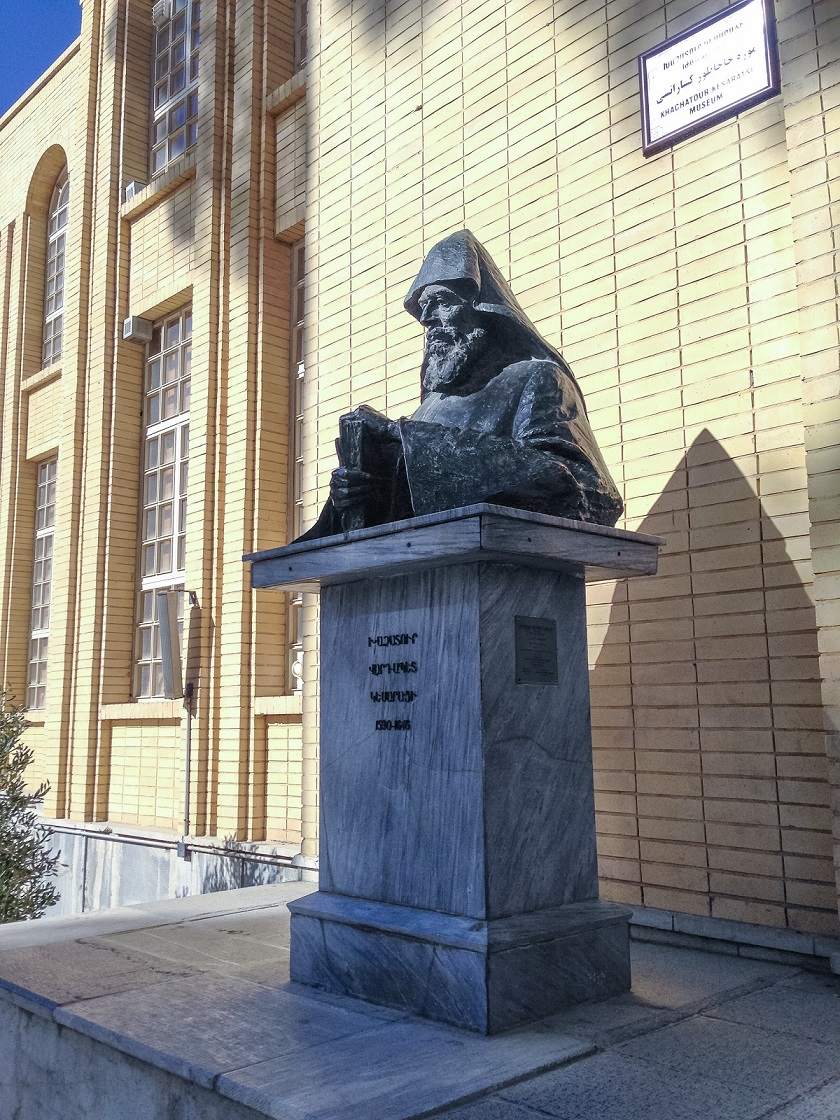
Statue of Khachatur Kesaratsi, founder of the first publishing house in Iran

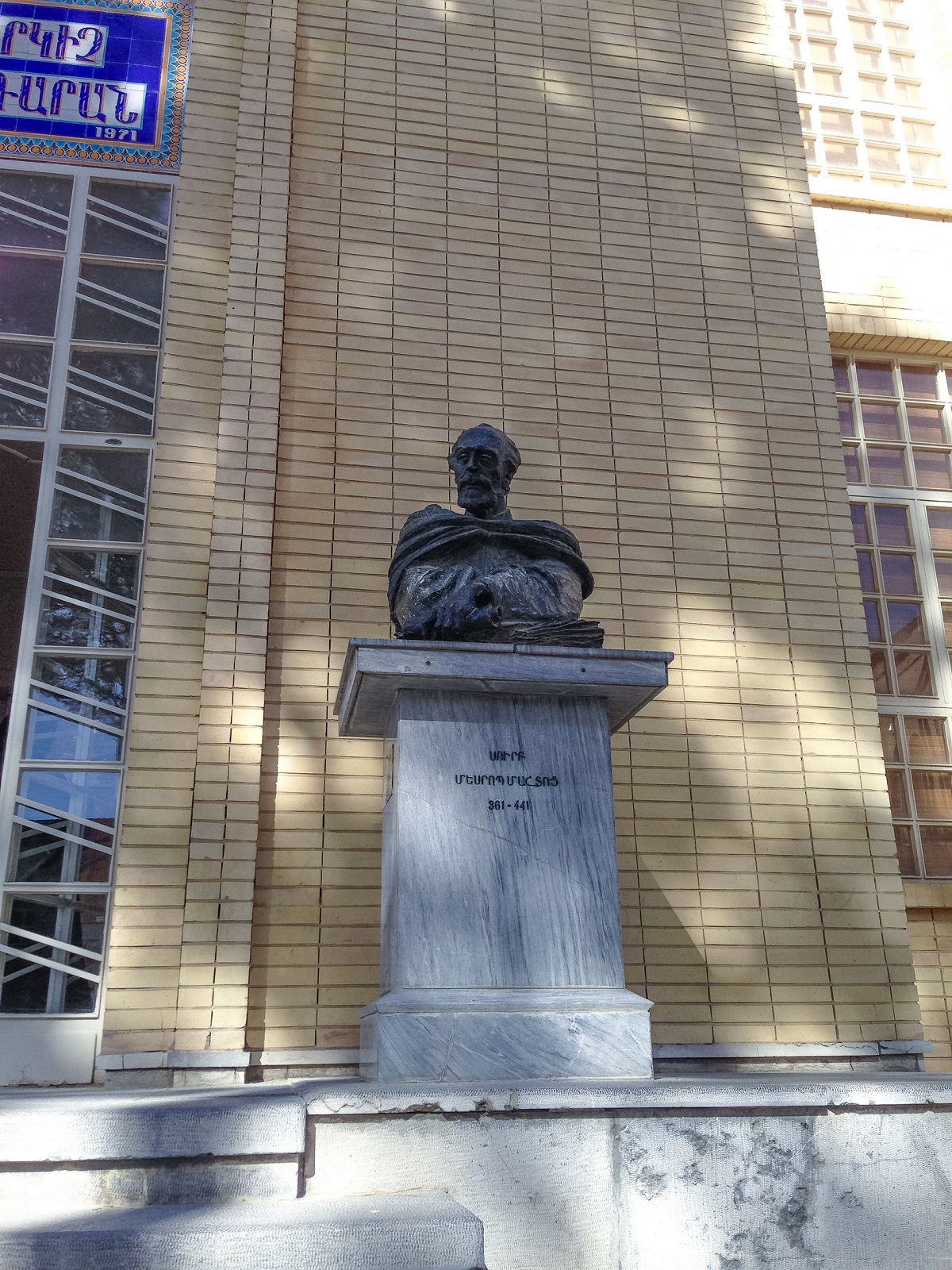
Statue of Mesrop Mashtots, the inventor of the Armenian alphabet

- Apcar family – merchant family
- Sceriman family – merchant family
- De l'Estoile family – merchant family
- Lazarian family (ru) – noble family
- Sarkies Brothers – businessmen
- Khwaja Safar (d. 1618) – mayor of Julfa
- Martin the Armenian (hy) (d. 1619) – first Armenian-American / Iranian-American
- Azaria Jughayetsi (hy) (16th century) – notary
- Mesrop of Khizan (c. 1560 – c. 1652) – manuscript illuminator
- Stepanos Dzik Jughayetsi (hy) (1583–1647) – writer
- Khachatur Kesaratsi (1590–1646) – archbishop and publisher (hy)
- Khvajeh Petros Velijanian (fa) (d. 1649) – merchant
- Simeon Jughayetsi (ru) (d. 1657) – scholar
- Hakob IV of Julfa (fr) (1598–1680) – Catholicos (1655–80)
- Mirman Mirimanidze (17th century) – mayor of New Julfa
- Otar Beg (1583–1663) – mayor of New Julfa
- Hakop Jughayetsi (ru) (17th century) – manuscript illuminator
- Siet Khachikian (hy) (17th century) – diplomat
- Grigor Usta (hy) (17th century) – architect
- Hovhannes Jughayetsi Ktreshents (hy) (17th century) – printer
- Kostand Jughayetsi (hy) (17th century) – scholar
- Marcara Avanchintz (17th century) – merchant
- Minas (hy) (17th century) – painter
- Hovhannes Jughayetsi Ktreshents (hy) (c.1610–c.1660) – publisher
- Minas Jughayetsi (hy) (1610–1670) – painter
- Mohammad Beg (d. 1671) – mayor of New Julfa
- Voskan Yerevantsi (1614–1674) – publisher
- Hajji Piri (d. 1694) – mayor of New Julfa
- Bogdan Saltanov (1630–1703) – painter
- Hovhannes Mrkouz (1643–1715) – philosopher
- Egaz Norjughayetsi (hy) (1650–1734) – musician
- Ghul Arzuni (hy) (1650–1750) – musician
- Arzuni Jughayetsi (hy) (1650–1750) – musician
- Arapiet di Martin (hy) (1650–1760) – musician
- Petik and Sanos (16th and 17th centuries) – merchants
- Stepanos Dashtetsi (ru) (1653–1720) – writer
- Abgar Ali Akbar Armani (d. 1708) – merchant
- Alexander I of Julfa (d. 1714) – Catholicos (1706–14)
- Petros di Sargis Gilanents (ru) (d. 1724) – merchant
- Hagopdjan de Deritchan (d. 1726) – diplomat
- Coja Petrus Uscan (1680–1751) – merchant
- Aghazar di Khachik (hy) (1690–1750) – military man
- Grigor Harutiunian (ru) (d. 1763) – political leader
- Aghazar Lazarian (hy) (1700–1782) – merchant
- Zaccaria Seriman (it) (1709–1784) – writer
- Tovmas Khojamalian (ru) (c.1720–1780) – historian
- Shahamir Shahamirian (1723–1798) – political activist
- Stefano Domenico Sceriman (it) (1729–1806) – writer
- Ivan Lazarevich Lazarev (1735–1801) – jeweller
- Petros Kalantarian (hy) (1735–1???) – physician
- Minas Lazarian (hy) (1737–1809) – politician
- Astvadsatour Babikian (de) (1738–1825) – writer
- Khachatour Lazarian (hy) (1741–1774) – politician
- Hovakim Lazarian (hy) (1743–1826) – political activist
- Nikoghayos Aghababaian (hy) (1750–1809) – merchant
- Khachatur Jughayetsi (hy) (18th century) – historian
- Movses Baghramian (18th century) – political activist
- Tadevos Soginian (hy) (18th century) – political activist
- Ivan Karapet (hy) (18th century) – political activist
- George Manook (1763–1827) – merchant
- Alexander Raphael (1775–1850) – British-Armenian politician
- Hakob Hovnatanyan (1806–1871) – painter
- Tadevos Avetoumian (hy) (1811–1863) – writer
- Zerouni Masehian (fa) (1811–18??) – goldsmith
- Megrtich Emin (ru) (1815–1890) – scholar
- Minus Megerdich Zorab (1833–1896) – painter
- Tiruhi Ter-Nahapetian (hy) (19th century) – artist
- Mirza Malkam Khan (1834–1908) – politician
- Martiros Khan Davidkhanian (1843–1905) – general
- Sarkis Khan Davidkhanian (1846-?) – general
- Eskandar Khan Davidkhanian – professor and general
- Markar Khan Davidkhanian (19th century) – minister of finance
- Tiruhi Ter-Nahapetian (hy) (19th century) – artist
- Vittoria Aganoor (1855–1910) – poet
- Minas Manook Basil (Barseghian) (hy) (1857–1922) – physician
- Diana Abgar (1859–1937) – diplomat
- Matevos Aghakhan Karakhanian (fa) (1860–1946) – photographer
- Arathoon Stephen (1861–1927) – businessman
- Hovsep Mirzayan (hy) (1868–1935) – politician
- Mesrovb Jacob Seth (1871–1939) – scholar
- Hovhannes Abkarian (fa) (1875–1931) – musician
- Freydoun Malkom (1875–1954) – the first Iranian participated in the Olympic Games in 1900
- Tigran Abgarian (hy) (1877–1950) – philologist
- Petros Abkar (fa) (1884–19??) – politician
- Megrdich Abgar (hy) (1884–1967) – archbishop
- Mkrtich Hakobian (hy) (1885–1971) – photographer
- Minas Patkerhanian (hy) (1885–1972) – photographer
- Markar Galstiants (fa) (1888–1985) – architect
- Yeghia Velijanian (hy) (1889–1976) – artist
- Guregh Israelian (1894–1949) – Armenian Patriarch of Jerusalem (1944–49)
- Zabel Stepanian-Bartev (fa) (1894–1982) – telegraph technician
- Karo Minassian (hy) (1897–1973) – physician
- Meguertitch Khan Davidkhanian (1902–1983) – general and politician
- Haykush Ter-Martirosian (hy) (1905–1987) – actress
- Bersabe Hovsepian (hy) (1906–1999) – public figure
- Rafael Atayan (hy) (1907–1990) – writer
- Poghos Petrosian (hy) (1907–19??) – bishop
- Abraham Gurgenian (hy) (1908–1991) – painter
- Annik Shefrazian (1909–1996) – actress
- Aramais Aghamalian (1910–1985) – film director
- Johny Baghdasarian (fa) (1913–1979) – film director
- Sumbat Der Kiureghian (1913–1999) – painter
- Yervand Nahapetian (fa) (1916–2006) – painter
- Emma Abrahamian (fa) (b. 1919) – sculptor
- Alain John (1920–1943) – sculptor
- Alenush Terian (1920–2011) – astronomer and physicist
- Levon Minassian (fa) (1920–2013) – scholar
- Sevak Saginian (fa) (1921–2003) – politician
- Clara Abkar (hy) (1922–1996) – painter
- Hrand Ghoukasian (fa) (1927–1996) – physician and translator
- Arsham Yesayi (fa) (b. 1931) – tennis player
- Neshan Sarkissian (Karekin I) (1932–1999) – Prelate of the Diocese of New Julfa (1971–75), Catholicos of Cilicia (1983–94) and Catholicos of All Armenians (1994–99)
- Nechan Karakéhéyan (b. 1932) – Catholic bishop of New Julfa (2000–05)
- Krzysztof Penderecki (b. 1933) – "Poland's greatest living composer"
- Nikol Faridani (1935–2008) – photographer
- Grish Davtian (hy) (b. 1935) – poet
- Alek Ter-Khachatourian (fa) (b. 1935) – translator
- Grigor Nazarian (hy) (b. 1937) – architect
- Varouj Karapetian (fa) (b. 1938) – film technician
- Arby Ovanessian (b. 1942) – film director
- Sako Ghoukasian (fa) (1943–2015) – opera singer
- George Bournoutian (b. 1943) – scholar
- Megerdich Toumanian (hy) (b. 1943) – mathematician
- Vartan Vartanian (fa) (b. 1943) – politician
- Nelson Shirvanian (hy) (1944–2018) – sculptor
- Tigran Toumanian (fa) (b. 1946) – film technician
- Armen Der Kiureghian (b. 1947) – scholar
- Herach Khachatourian (fa) (b. 1948) – politician
- Caro Lucas (1949–2010) – scholar
- Zaven Ghoukasian (fa) (1950–2015) – film director
- Masis Hambarsounian (b. 1950) – boxer
- Georgik Abrahamian (fa) (b. 1952) – politician
- Artavazd Baghoumian (fa) (b. 1953) – politician
- Jirayr Kocharian (hy) (b. 1955) – cartographer
- Hrant Markarian (b. 1958) – politician and chairman of the Armenian Revolutionary Federation
- Robert Beglarian (b. 1961) – politician
- Vahik Trossian (fa) (b. 1967) – football player
- Nairy Baghramian (b. 1971) – visual artist
- Aren Davoudi (b. 1986) – basketball player
- Oshin Sahakian (b. 1986) – basketball player
- Kajayr Hakopian (hy) (b. 1989) – actor
- Armen Tahmazyan (b. 1990) – football player

== Friendly cities ==
New Julfa has friendly relations with:

- Issy-les-Moulineaux, France

== Gallery ==
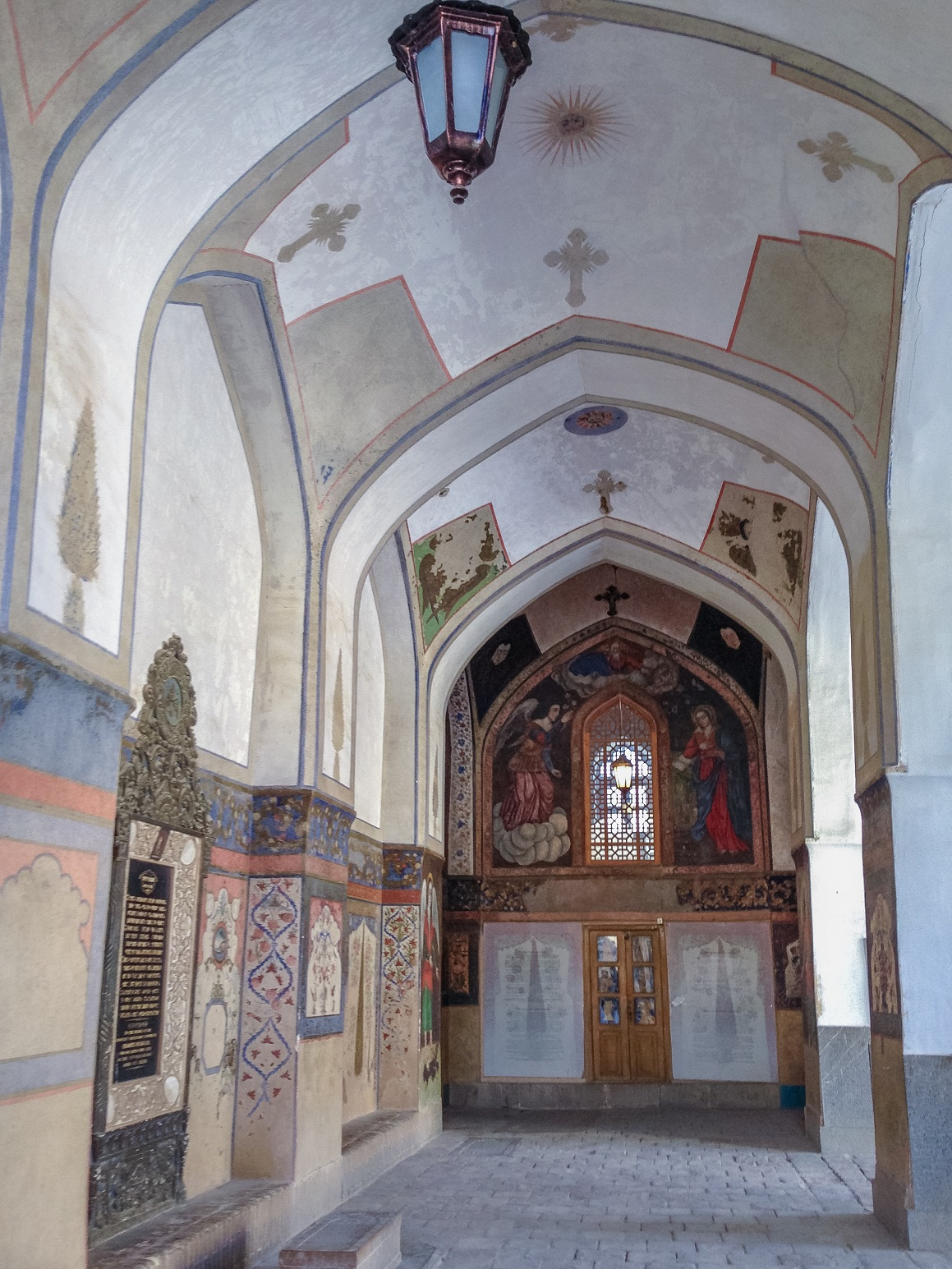
Entrance of the Vank Cathedral.

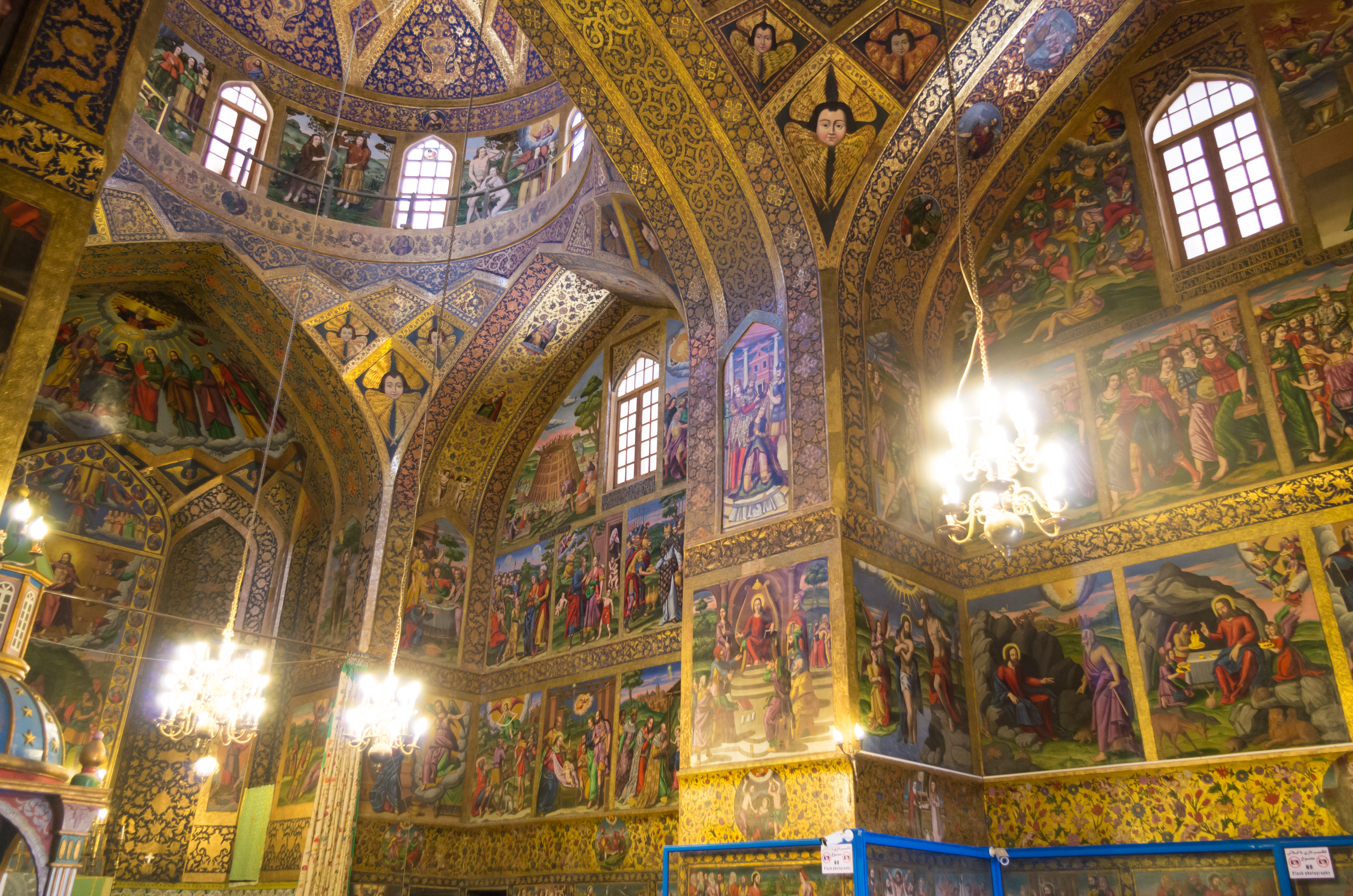
Inside the Vank Cathedral.

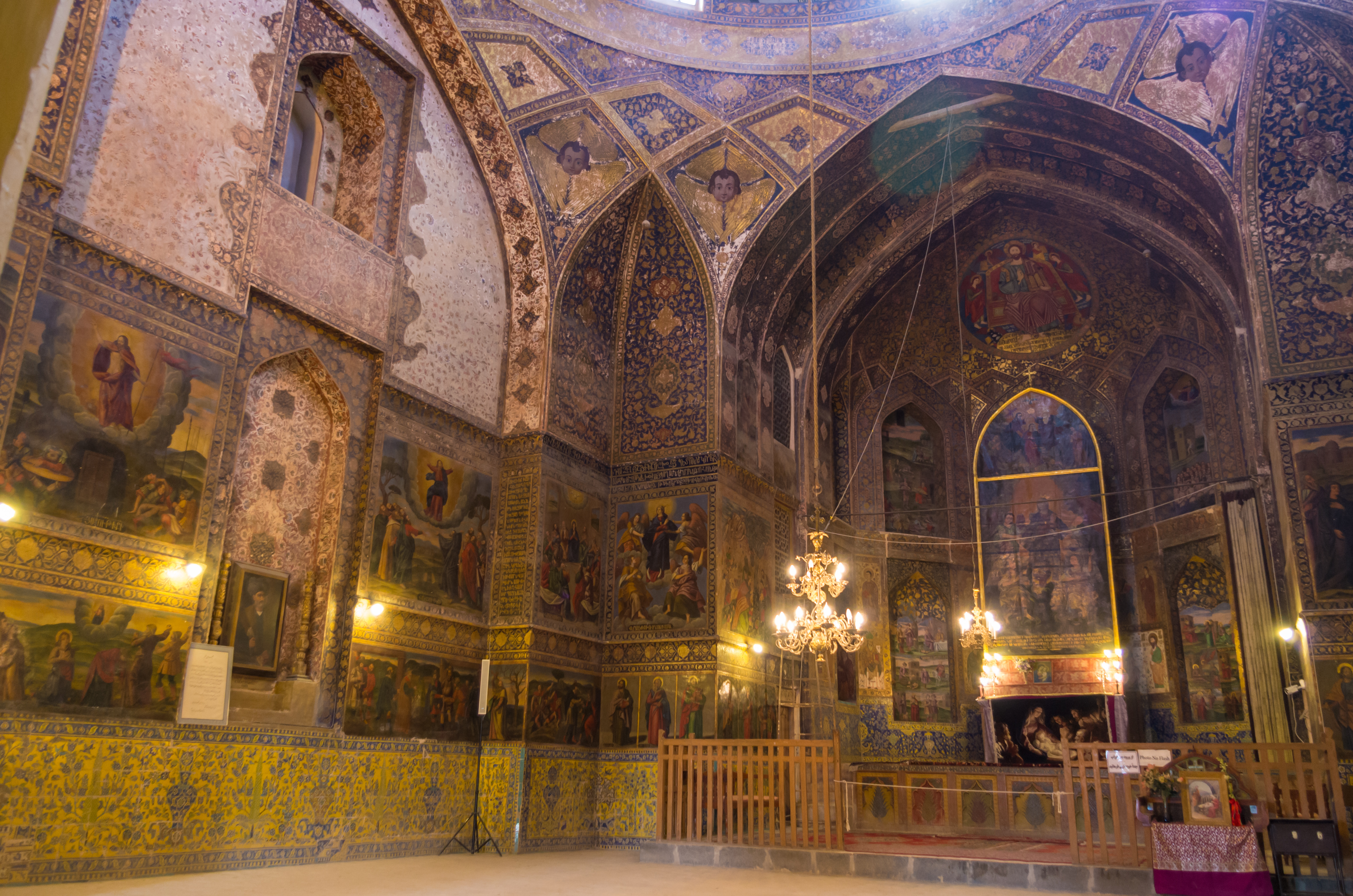
Inside the Surp Bethłehem Church.

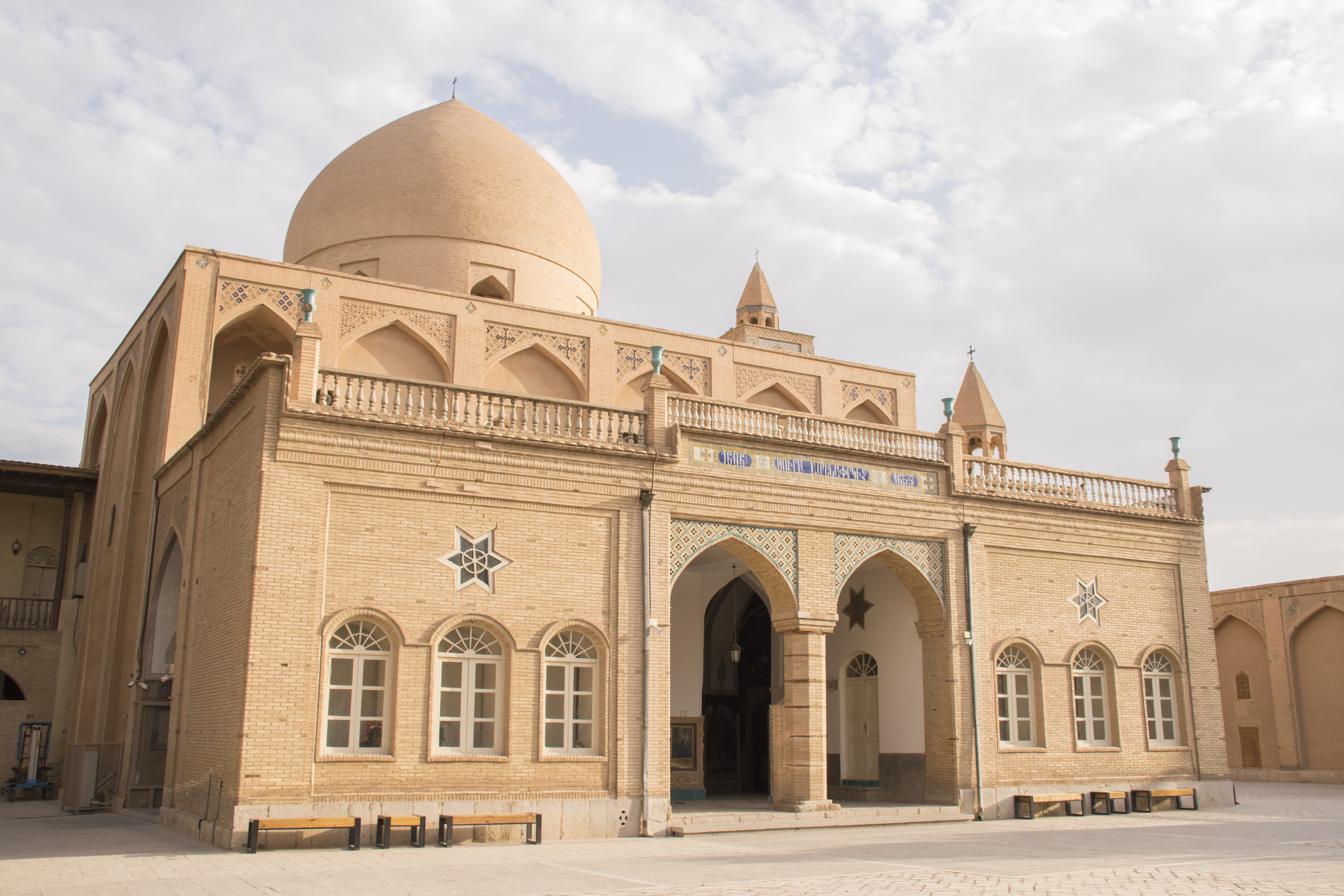
Vank Cathedral.

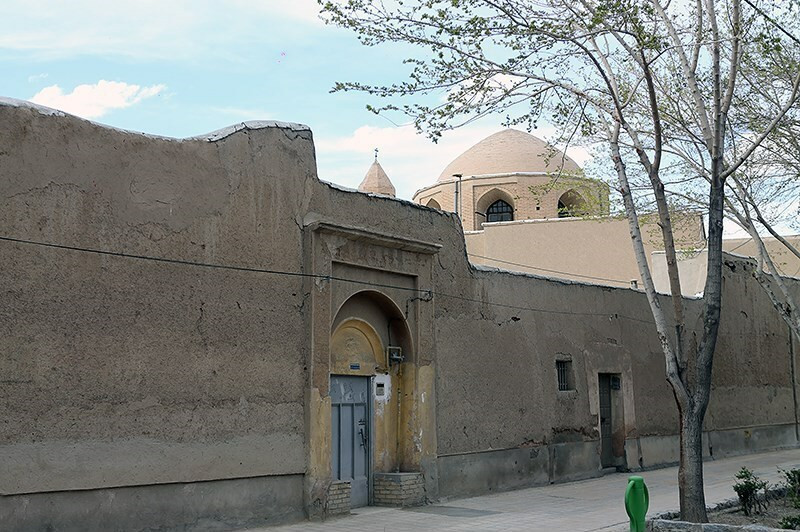
Surp Nikołayos Hayrapet Church.

== See also ==
- Deportation of Armenians to Iran
- Iranian Armenians
- Armenians in Iran
- Armenians of Julfa
- List of Armenian ethnic enclaves
- New Julfa Armenian Cemetery
- Armenian Cemetery in Old Julfa
- Armenian Apostolic Diocese of Isfahan and Southern Iran
- Roman Catholic Archdiocese of Ispahan
- Armenian Catholic Eparchy of Isfahan
- Apcar and Company

== Sources ==
- Yves Bomati and Houchang Nahavandi,Shah Abbas, Emperor of Persia,1587-1629, 2017, ed. Ketab Corporation, Los Angeles, ISBN 978-1595845672, English translation by Azizeh Azodi.
- Gregorian, Vartan. “Minorities of Isphahan: The Armenian Community of Isphahan, 1587-1722.” Iranian Studies 7, no. 2 (1974), pp. 652–81.
- Aslanian, Sebouh (2011). From the Indian Ocean to the Mediterranean: The Global Trade Networks of Armenian Merchants from New Julfa. California: University of California Press. pp. 1–392. ISBN 978-0520947573.
