= Bedkhem Church =

Historic church in Isfahan, Iran

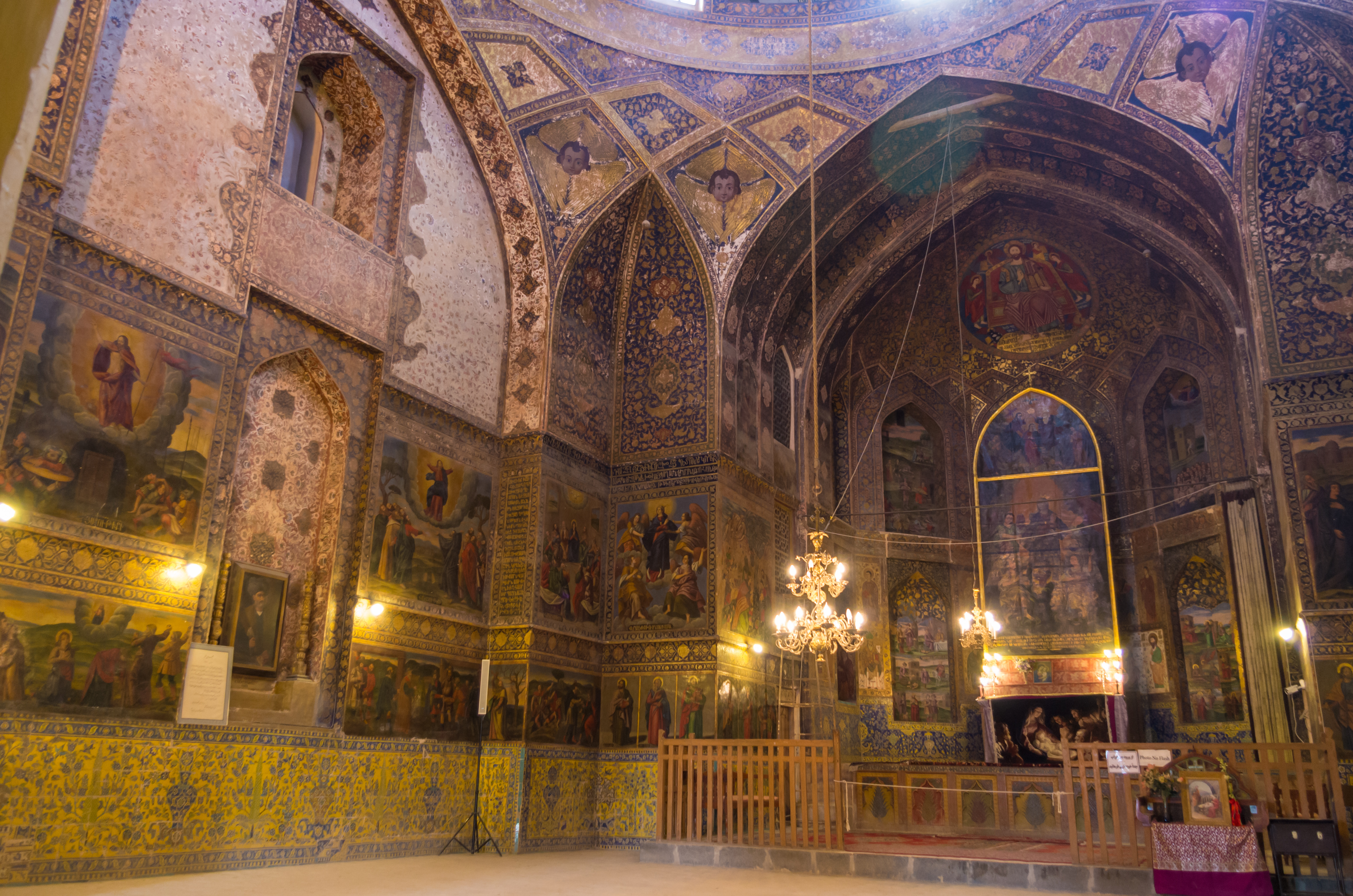

- Location within Iran

Religion
- Affiliation: Armenian Apostolic Church
- Province: Isfahan

Location
- Location: Julfa quarter, Isfahan, Iran
- Municipality: Isfahan
- Coordinates: 32.636448°N 51.658527°E

Architecture
- Type: Church
- Style: Isfahani
- Completed: 1627

Specifications
- Length: 31 m (102 ft)
- Height (max): 26 m

Holy Bethlehem Church of New Julfa (Armenian: Նոր Ջուղայի Սուրբ Բեթղեհեմ Եկեղեցի; Persian: کلیسای بیت لِحِم مقدس), also Bedkhem Church, is an Armenian Apostolic church in the New Julfa quarter in Isfahan, Iran. One of the most important historical churches of the city, it belongs to the Abbas I era. The church is located in the Julfa square near Saint Mary Church. The Bedkhem church was built by an Armenian merchant named Khaje Petros. There are decorations and paintings on its walls depicting the life of Jesus. The 72 exquisite paintings, painted by Armenian artists, are presented in two rows. In the lower row the paintings are painted sequentially, but in the upper row each painting is in a separate frame.

The architecture and the gilded decorations of the church's dome are notable. Inside the church there are inscriptions in Armenian which date back to 1627 and 1711. The inscriptions are installed in remembrance of those who performed charitable work for the church.

On the southern portal there is an inscription as follows:

Pray for Khaje Petros, who was a good man, in the presence of God. He built this church by his own personal expenditure for the immortality of his name and his father's name (Vali Jan) and his mother's name (Shoushan) and his family's name in 1077 (in the Armenian calendar which is 1627 in the Gregorian calendar).

The church has three parts:

- The entrance with a balcony, which seems to have been a special place for engaged girls.
- The chapel, above which is the dome.
- The apse

The church has a rectangular plan. The doors are 31 m long and 14 m high. Its dome is 26 in height. Opposite the church, there is a courtyard with two entrances.

== Gallery ==

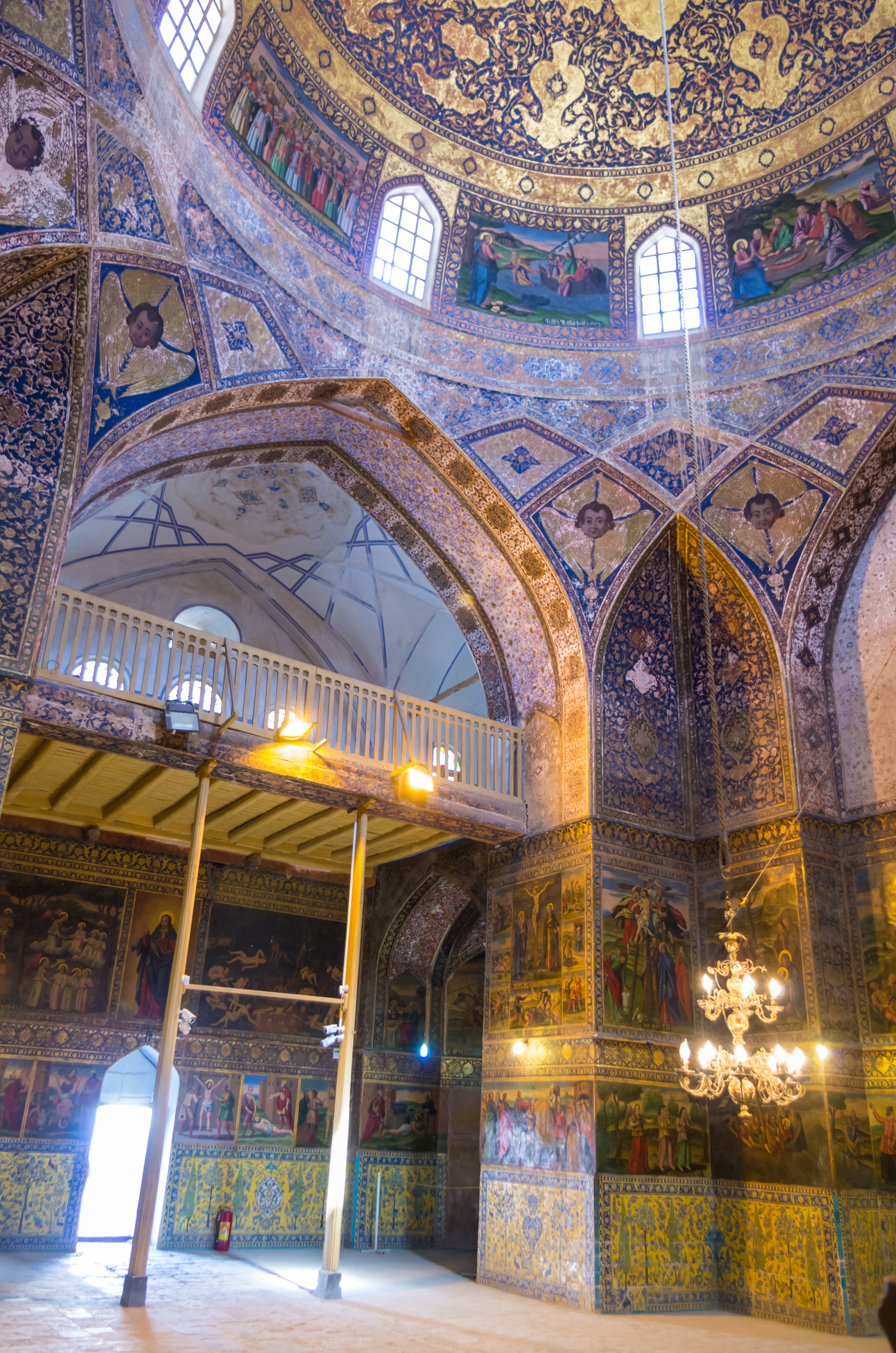

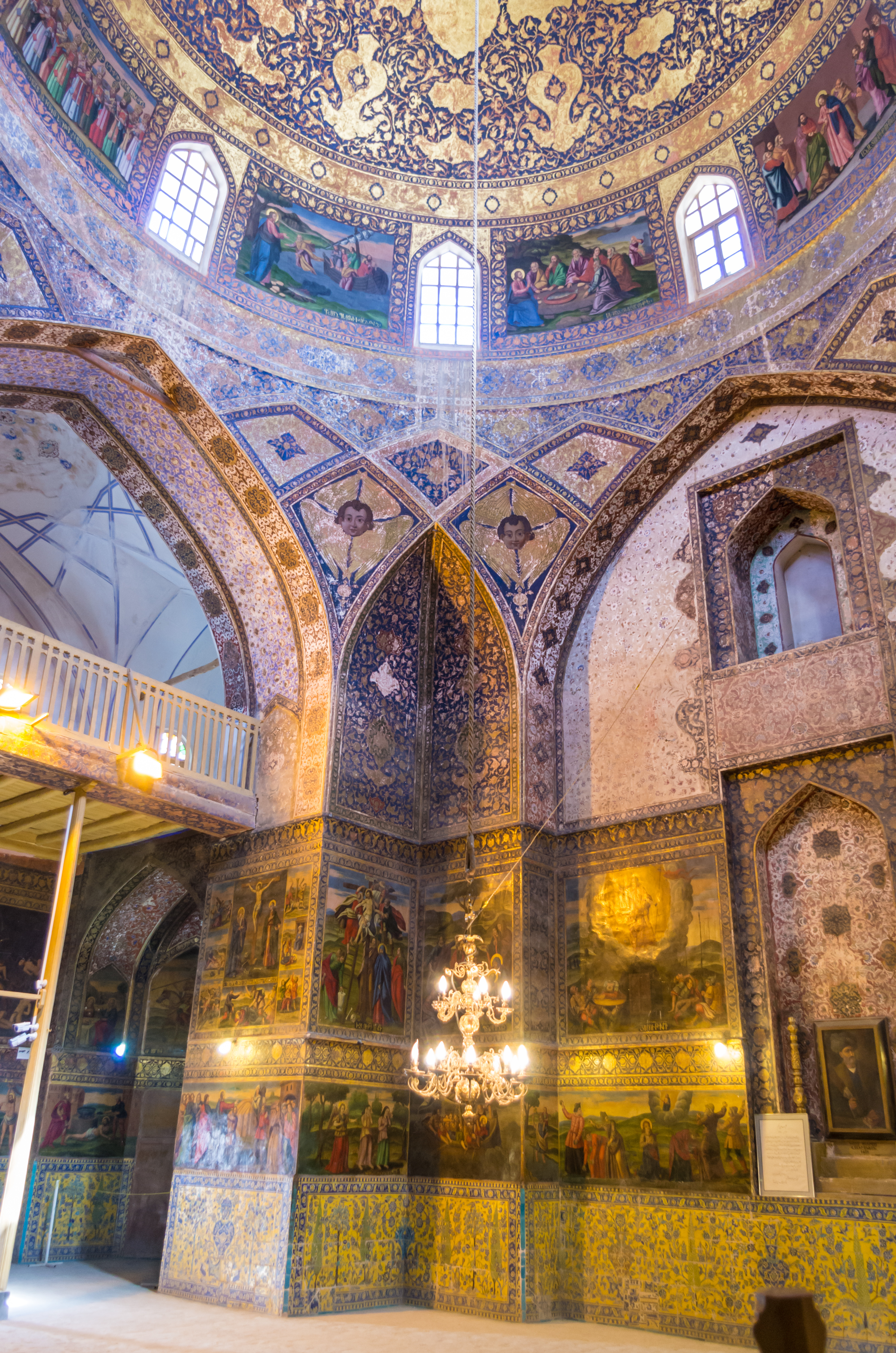

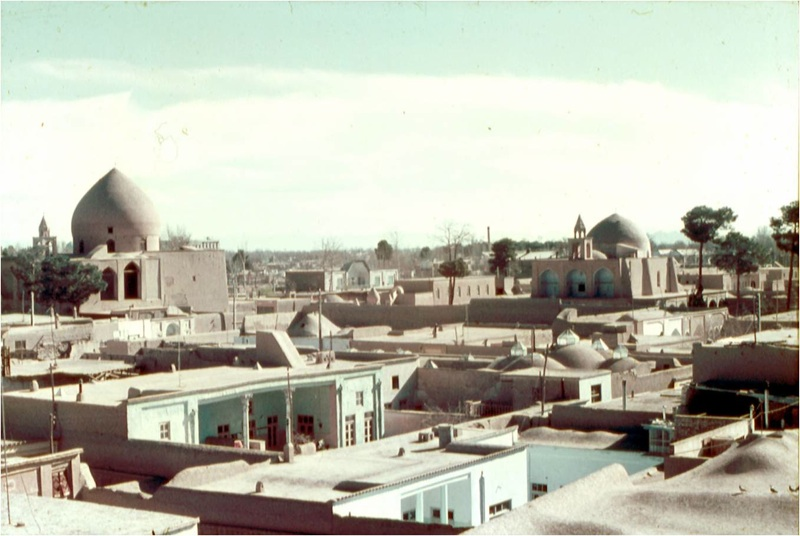
New Julfa Holy Bethlehem Church (left) and Saint Mary Church (right).

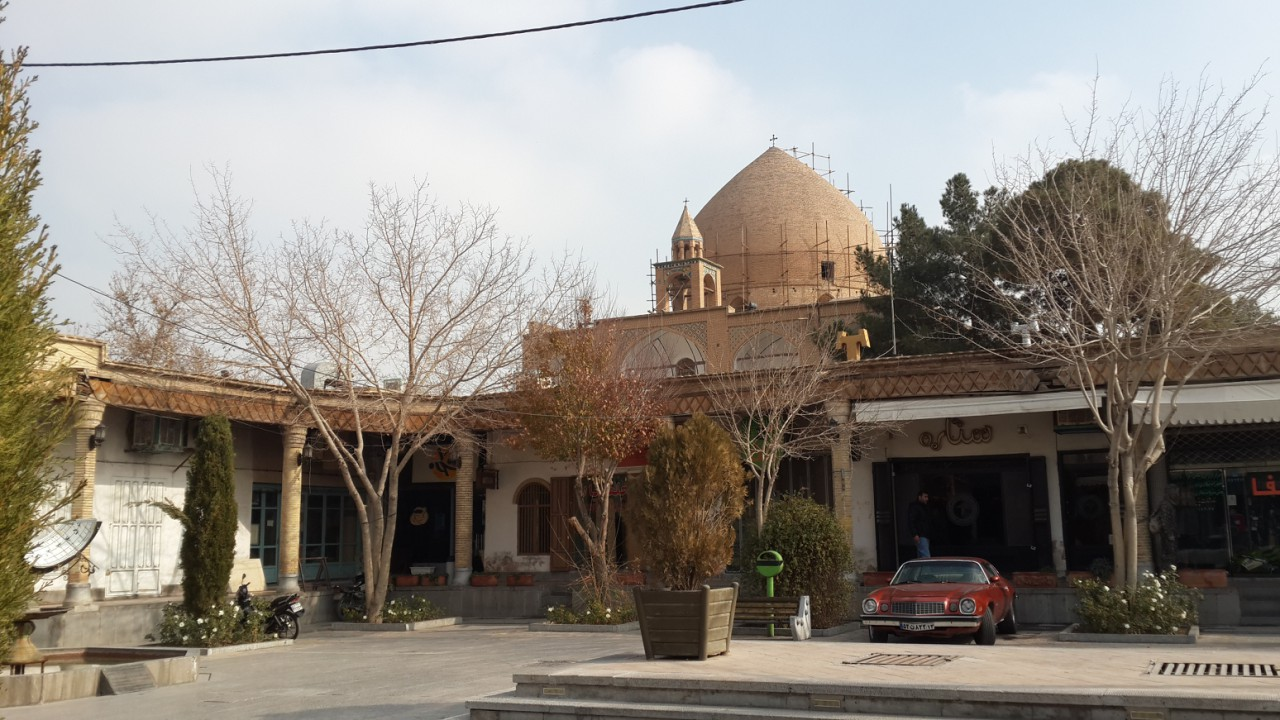
Holy Bethlehem Church from Julfa Square.

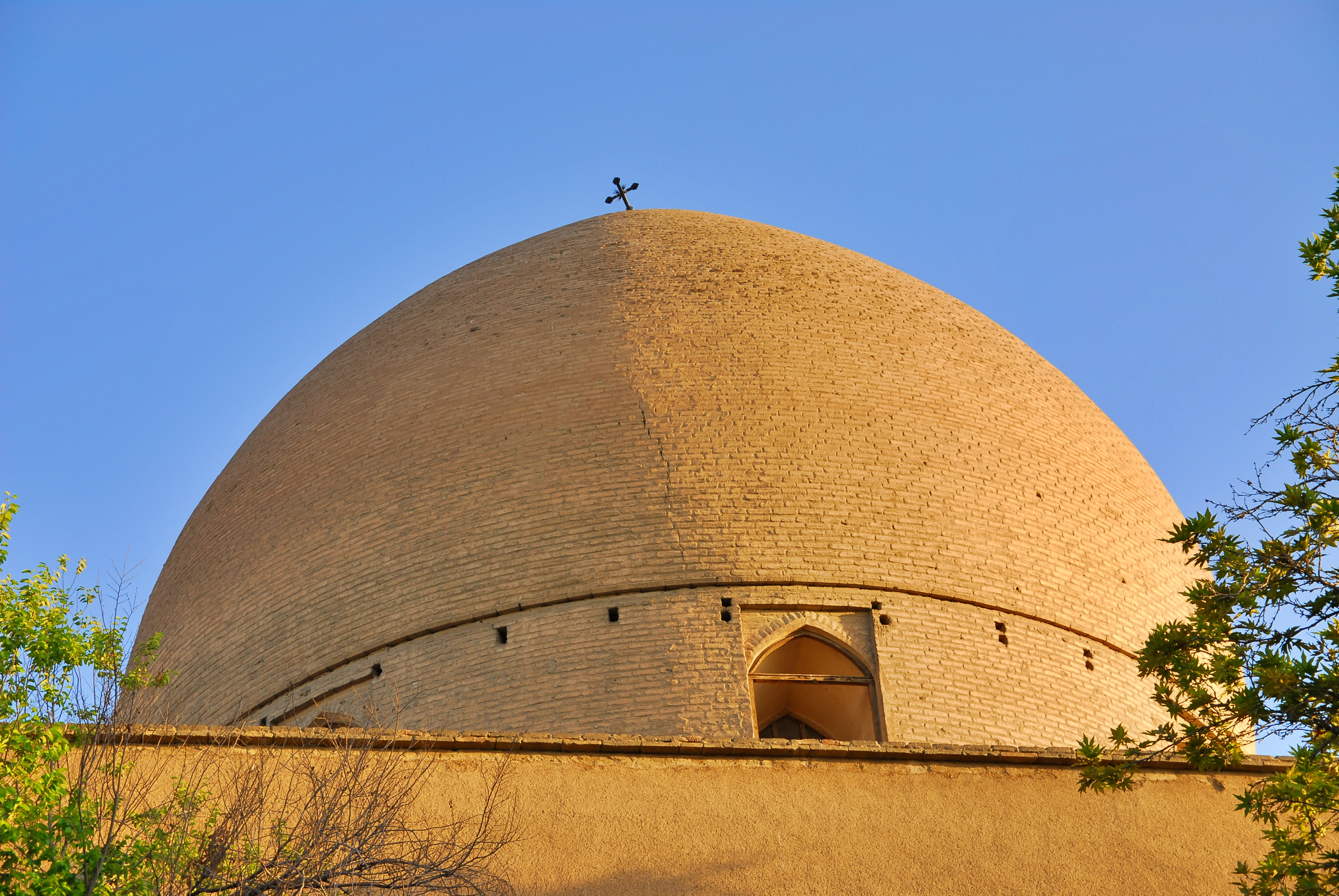
The church dome.

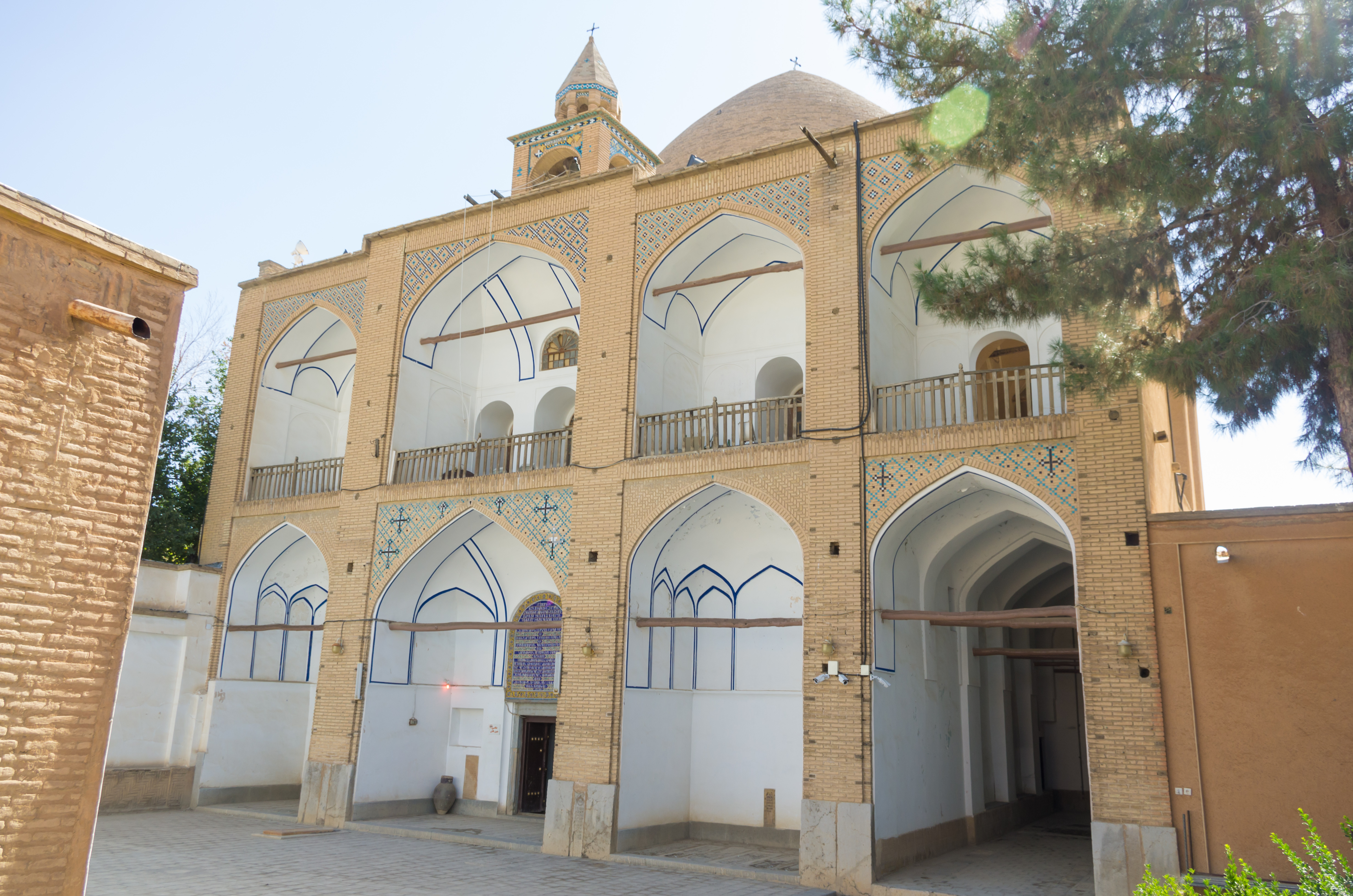
The church and its courtyard.

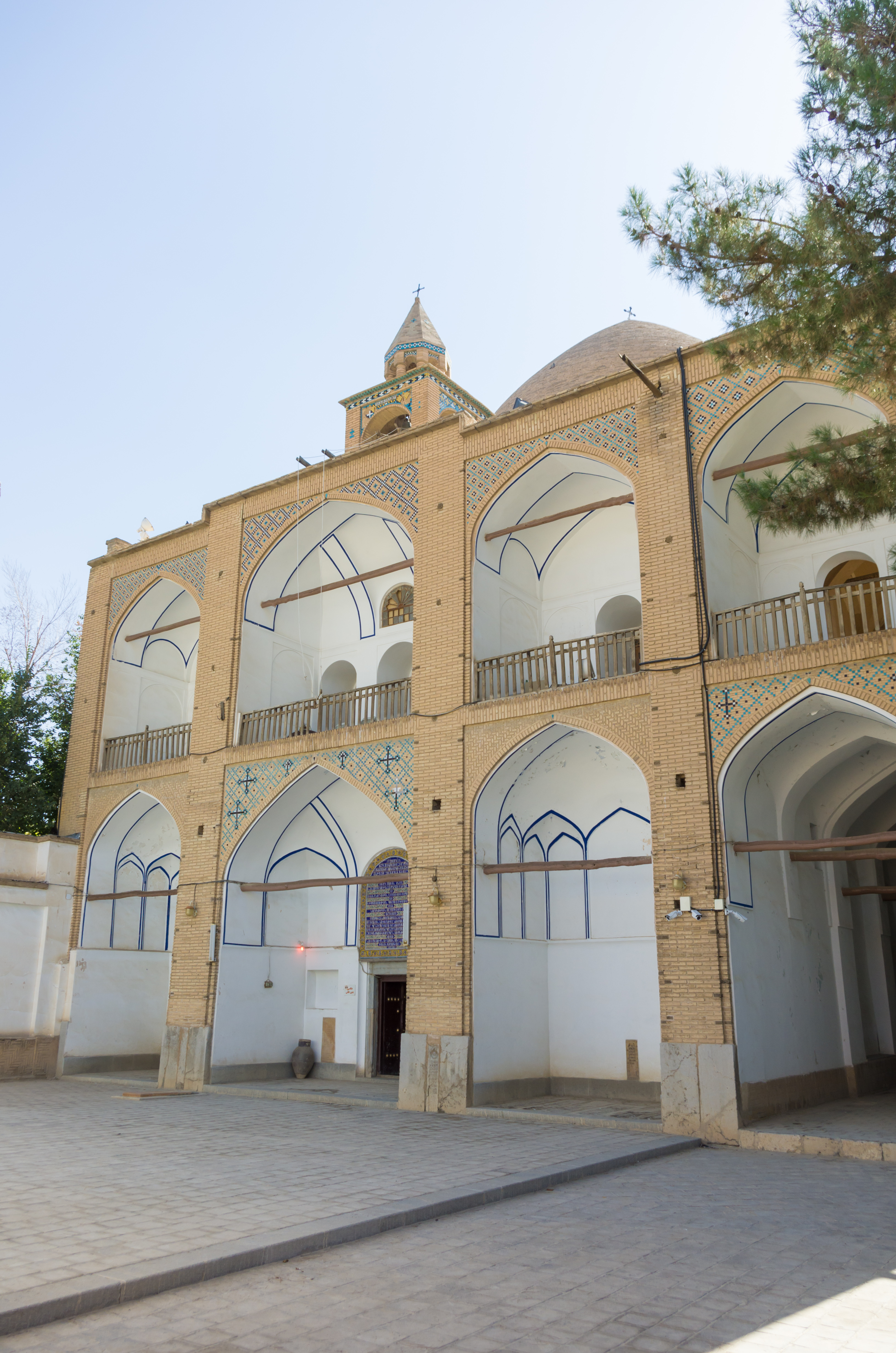
Facade of the church.

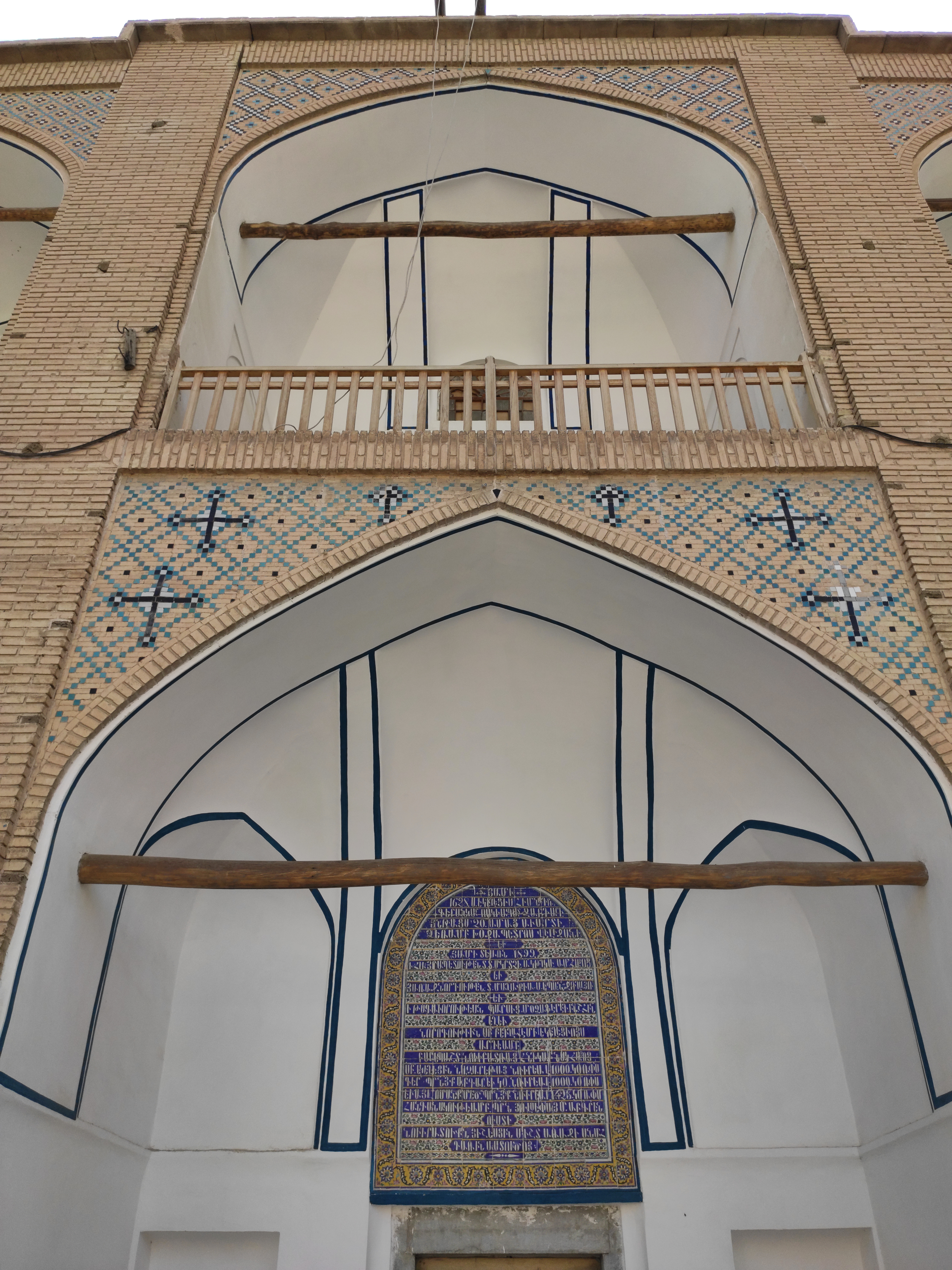
The church portal.

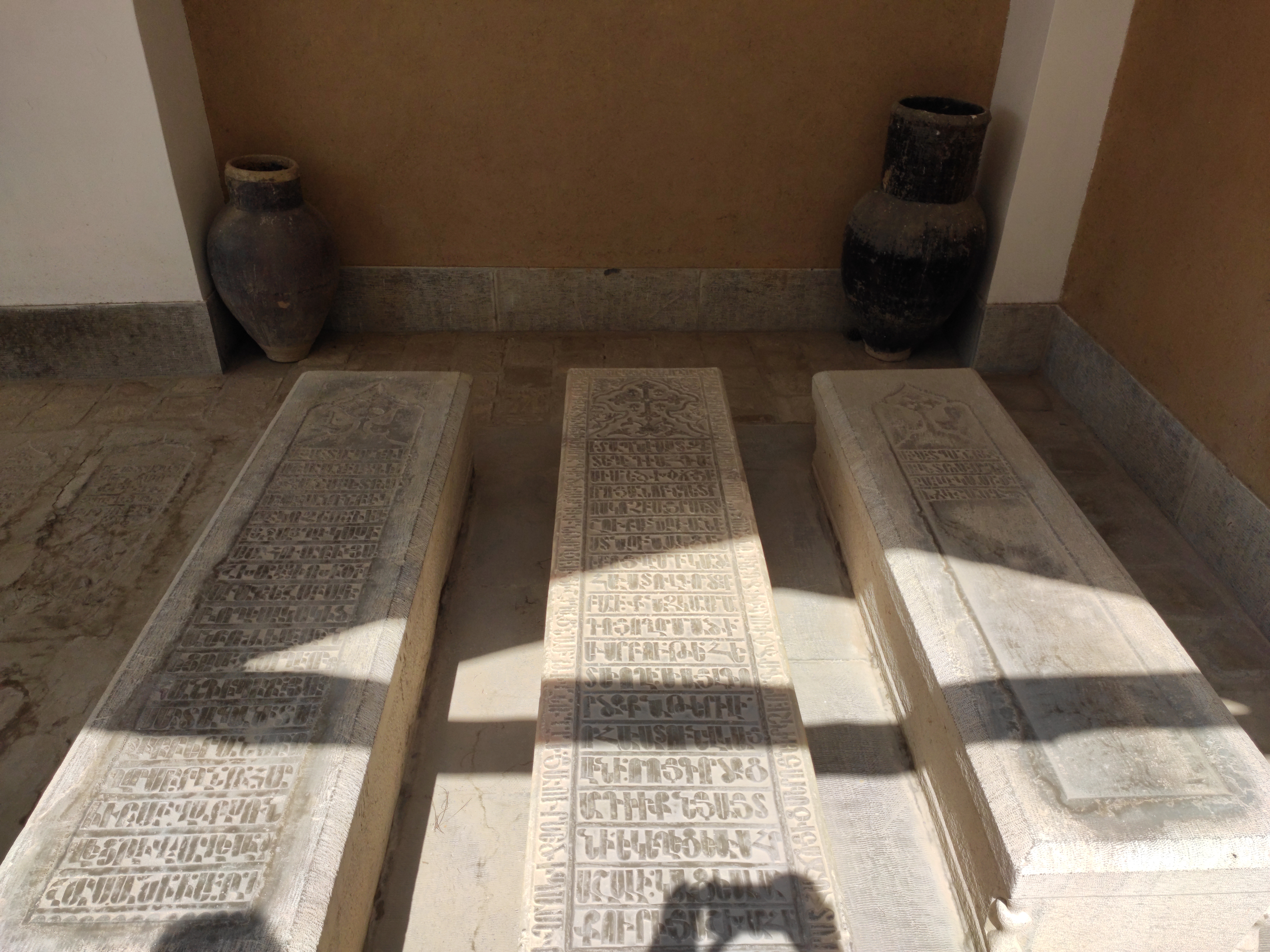
Graves in the courtyard of the church.

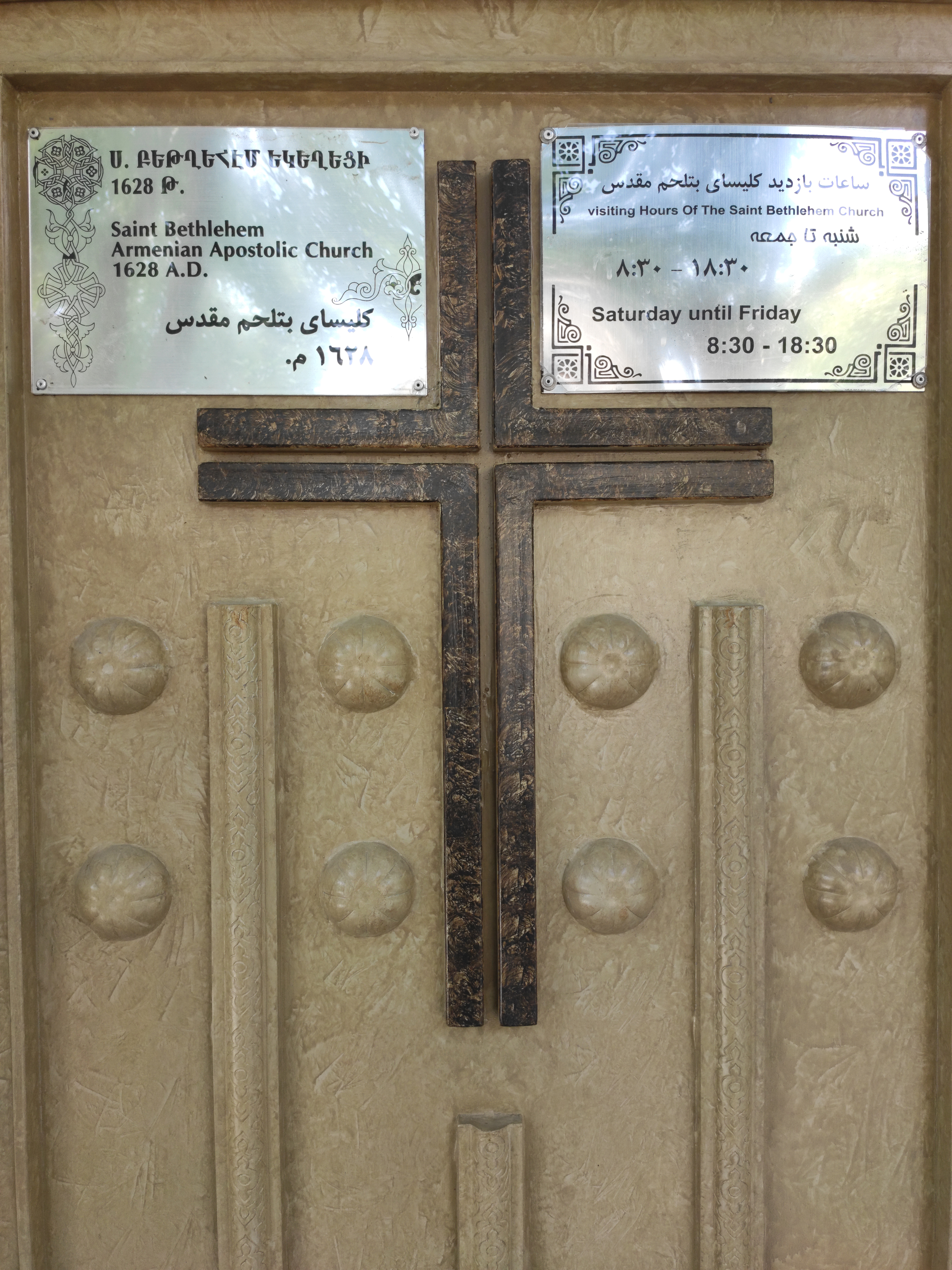
The main entrance.

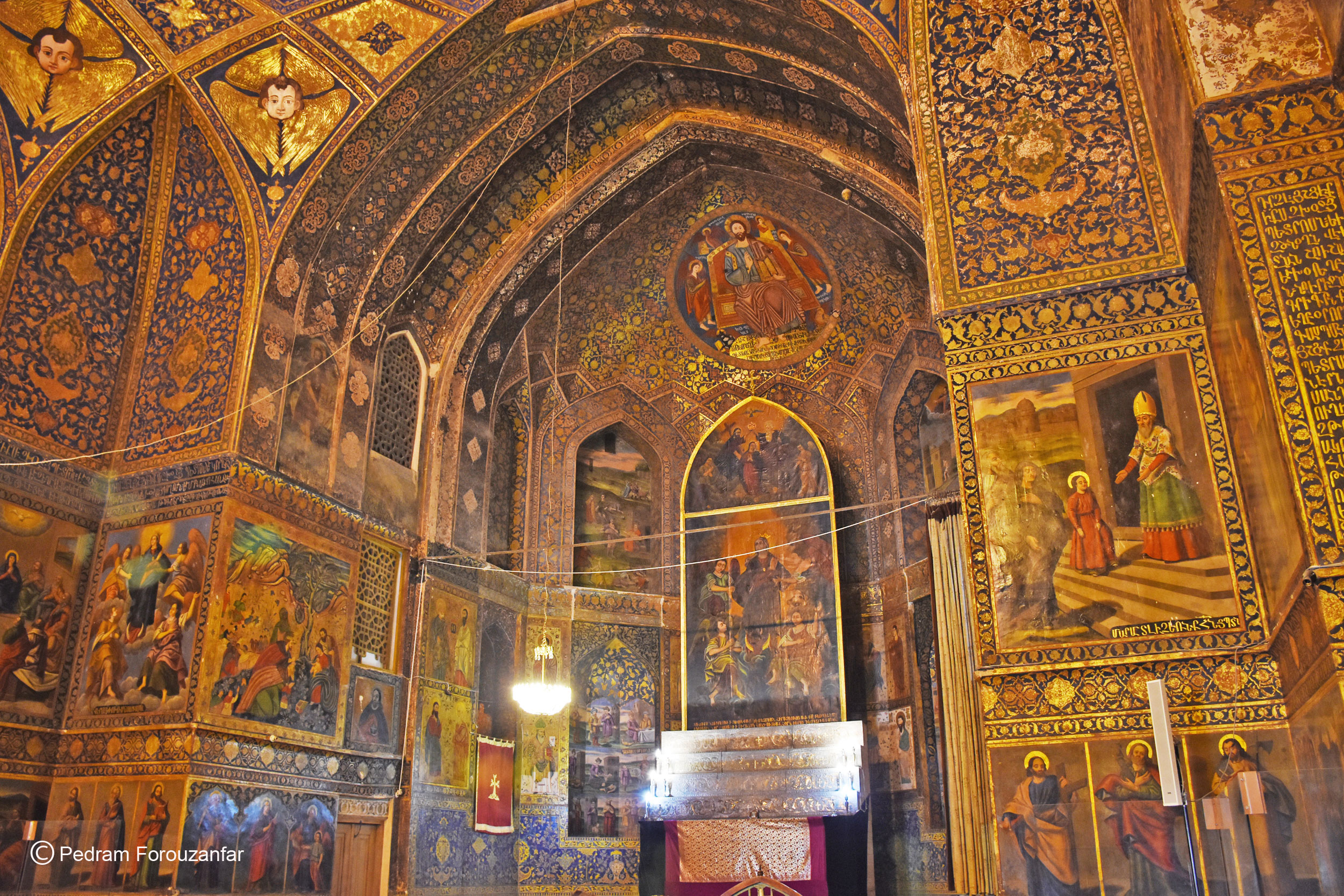
Altar of the church.

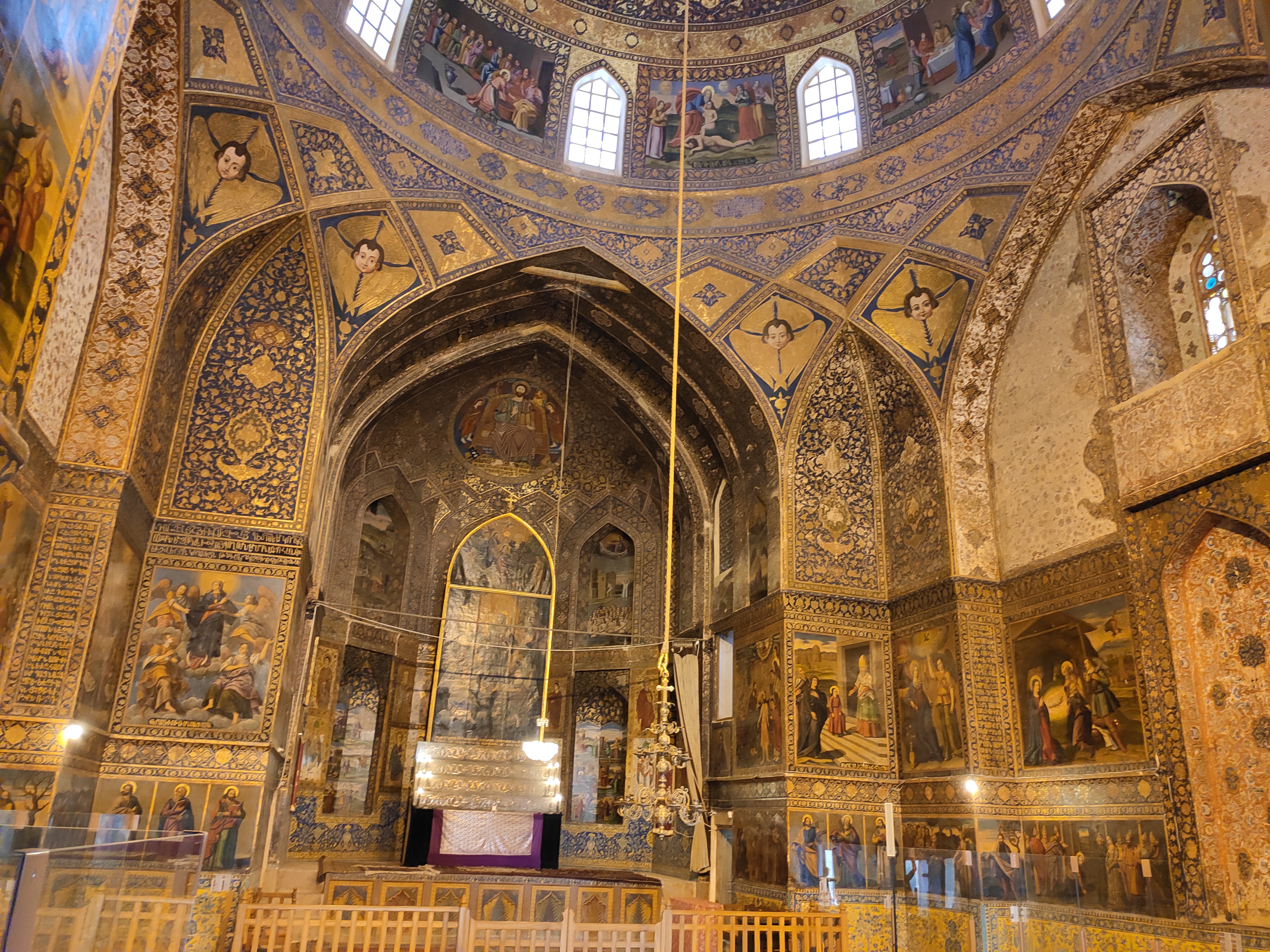

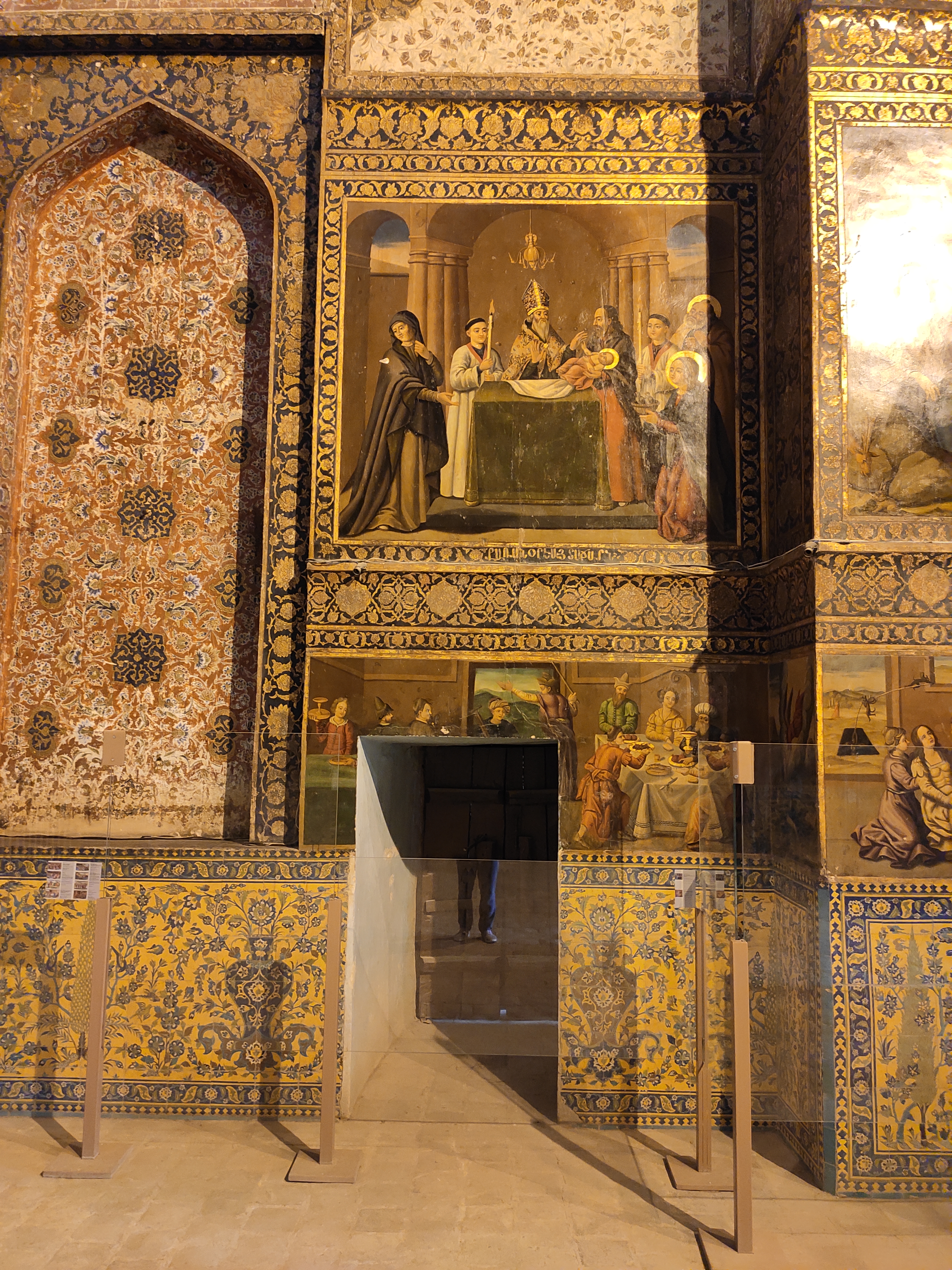

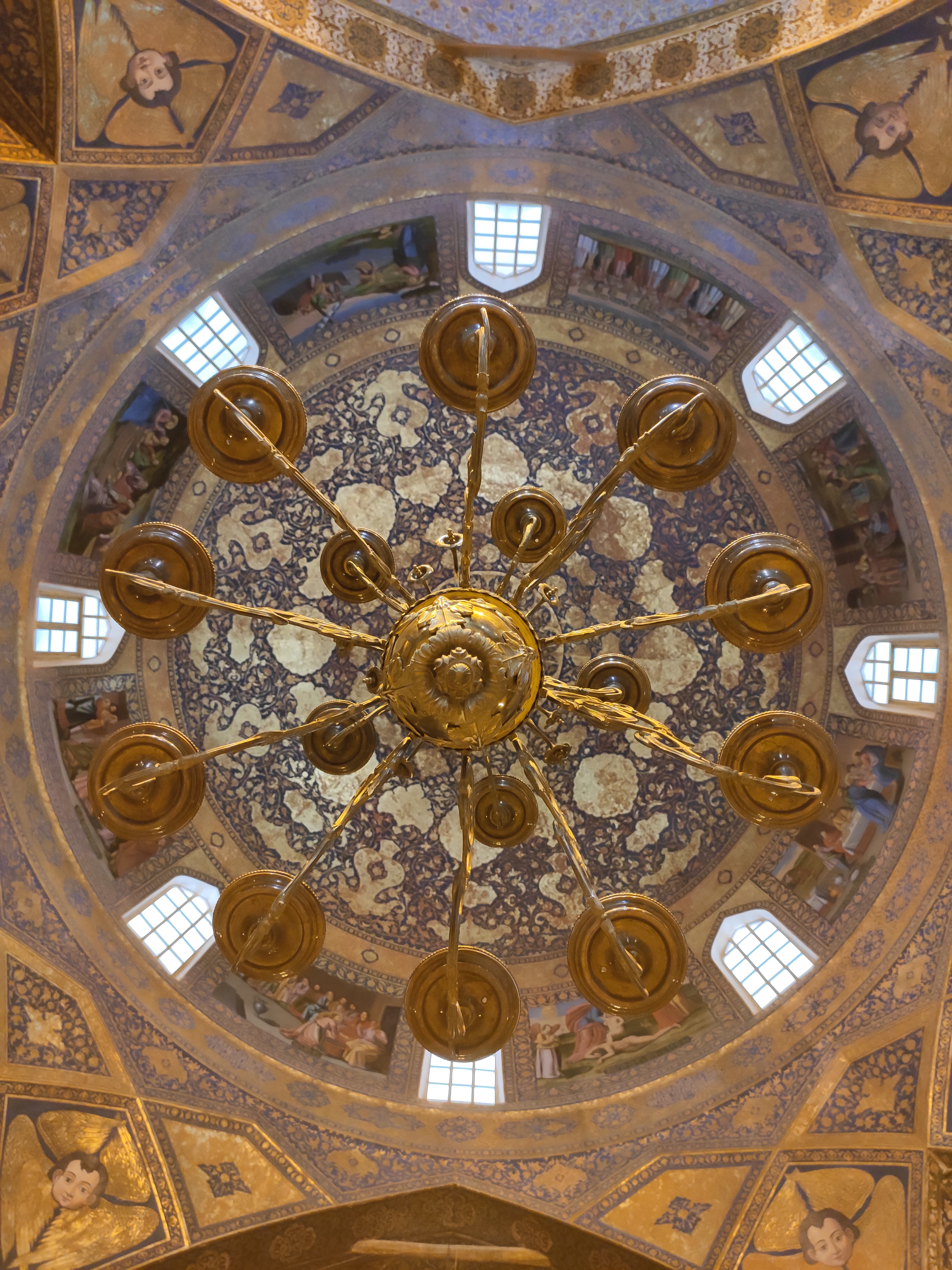

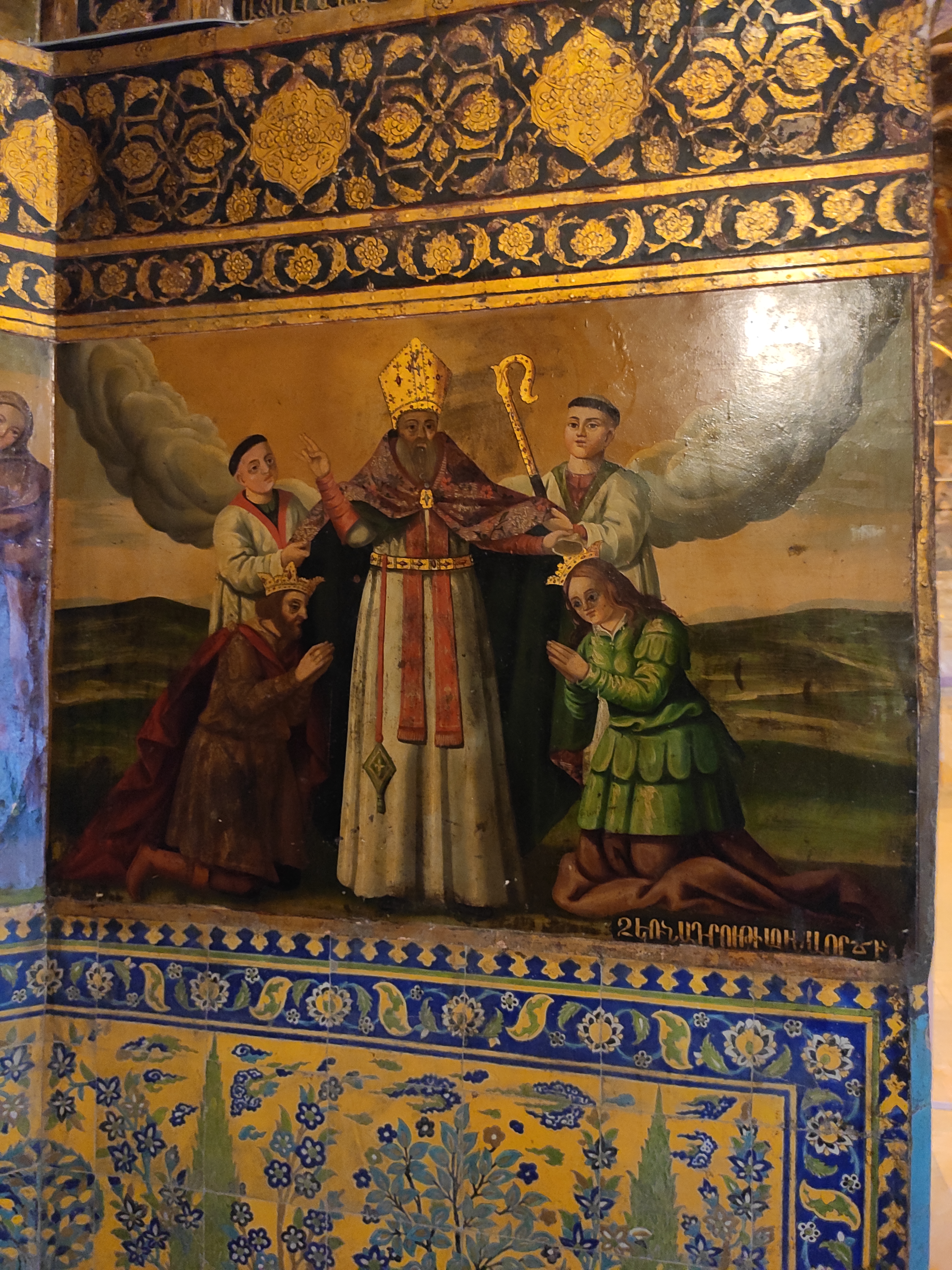

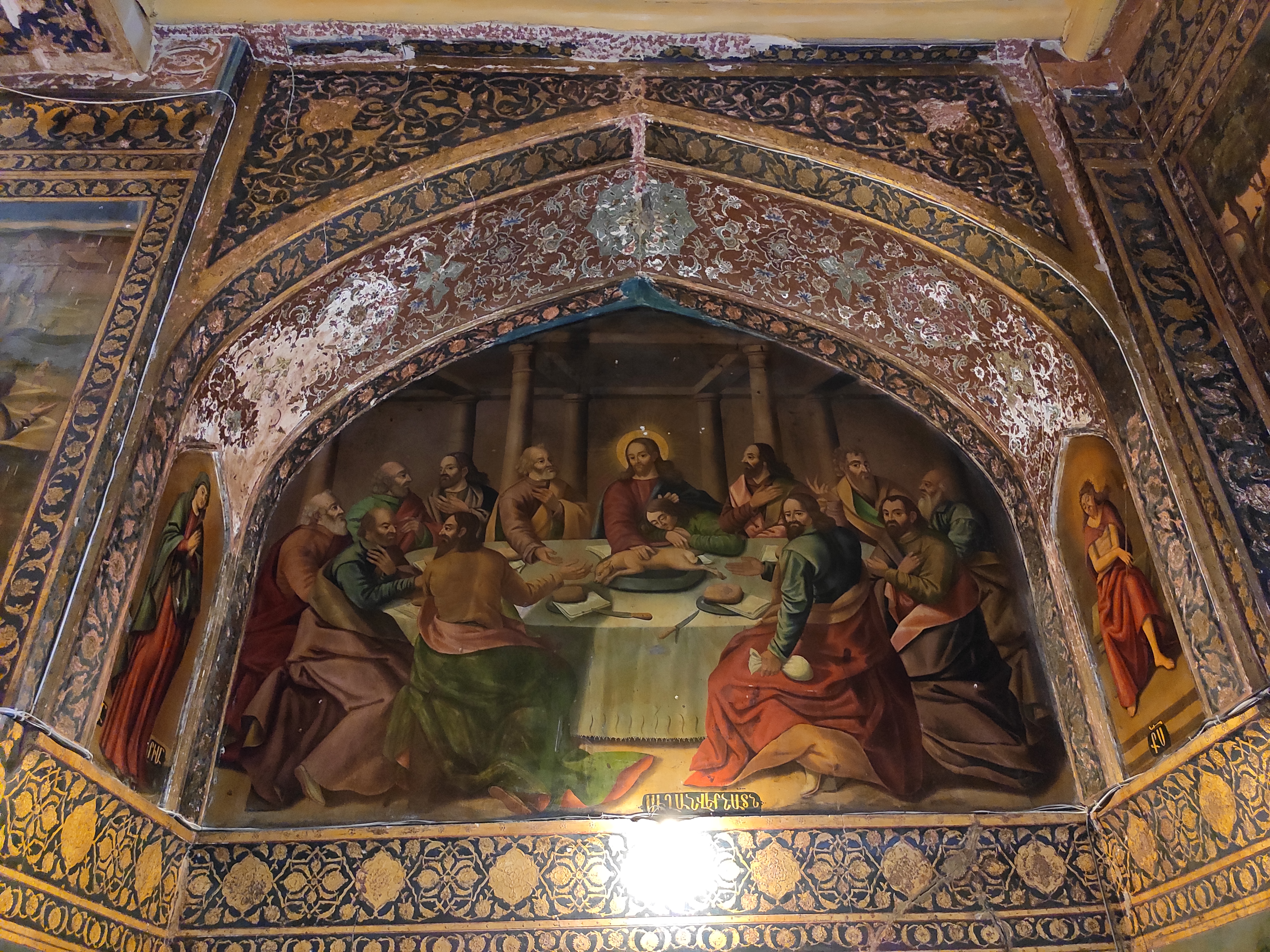

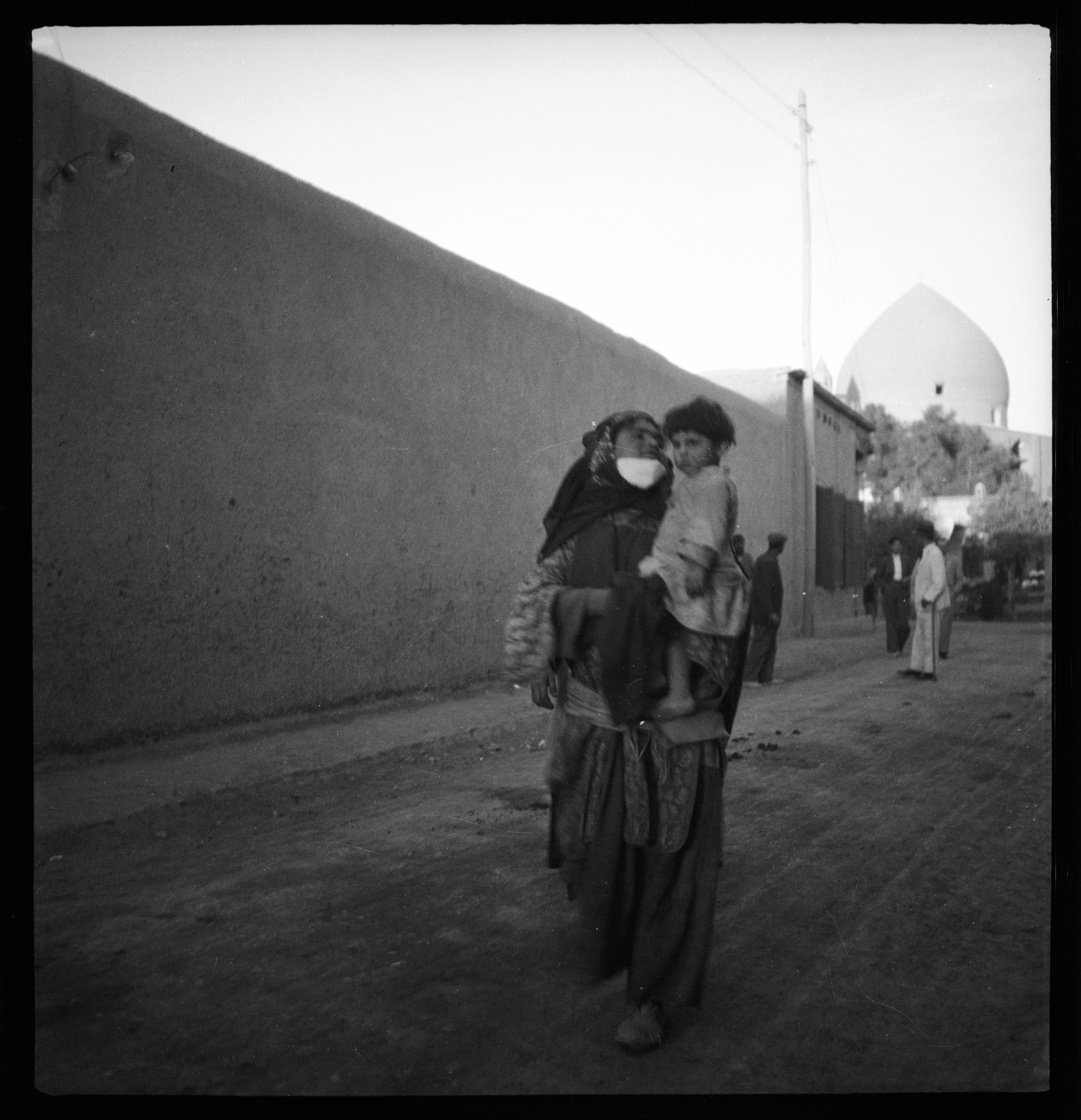
The church in the background, 1890s.
