= De l'Estoile family =

Family

The family de l'Estoile (also spelled as l'Etoile, l'Estoille and Lestoille) was a French family, whose members were noted for their activities in the Safavid Empire (1501-1736). The first known member of the family that moved to Iran was Isaac Boutet de l'Estoille (died 28 July 1667, in New Julfa). He served king Abbas I (r. 1588–1629) as a goldsmith, amongst others.

== Notable members ==
- Isaac Boutet de l'Estoille (died 28 July 1667, New Julfa)
- Louis-Guillherme de l'Estoile (died 16 June 1701, New Julfa)
- Angela de l'Estoille (died 1675)
- André de l'Estoille (died 1745, New Julfa)
- Alexandre de l'Estoille (died 1707, near Bandar Abbas)
- Reine de l’Estoile (died 1766), married to Jacques Rousseau (diplomat)
- Isaac de l'Estoille

== Sources ==
- Algar, Hamid (1973). Mīrzā Malkum Khān: A Study in the History of Iranian Modernism. University of California Press. p. 5. ISBN 978-0520022171.
- Floor, Willem; Herzig, Edmund, eds. (2012). Iran and the World in the Safavid Age. I.B. Tauris. pp. 311, 316–319, 321, 323.
- Kroell, Anne (1996). "EAST INDIA COMPANY". Encyclopaedia Iranica, Vol. VII, Fasc. 6. pp. 647–649.
