= Nikol Faridani =

Iranian photographer

Nikol Faridani (25 January 1936 – 6 February 2008) (Persian: نیکول فریدنی) was a popular Iranian Armenian photographer. Faridani was born in 1936 in Shiraz. His family moved to Isfahan when he was two and he completed his elementary education at the Shah Abbas School in Jolfa. Then they moved to Tehran and later to Kerman, and ultimately returned to Tehran in 1955. He got a job with the Iranian Oil Company, where he worked as a photographer for four years. He then was transferred to the Oil Consortium, where he worked for 15 years, gaining experience in geological photography, photomicrography, and aerial photography. He logged over 300 hours in the air as an aerial photographer. He quit in 1975 and started his own business.

Faridani was well known for photographing nature, especially deserts. He travelled extensively in India, Pakistan, Nepal and Afghanistan. He published his works in 2003 in Iran titled," Nikol Faridani; Collection of Images from Iran". The collection consists of two volumes, one in black-white (123 images) and one in color (257 images). The images are on 9 X 13 inches, presented in landscape format. On Dedication page, he offers the work to his two daughters, "Jacqueline and Katrin".

Faridani died on 6 February 2008, after suffering from prostate cancer, pneumonia, and Parkinson's disease. He is survived by two daughters from his first marriage.
