= Minus Megerdich Zorab =

Armenian painter (1833–1896)

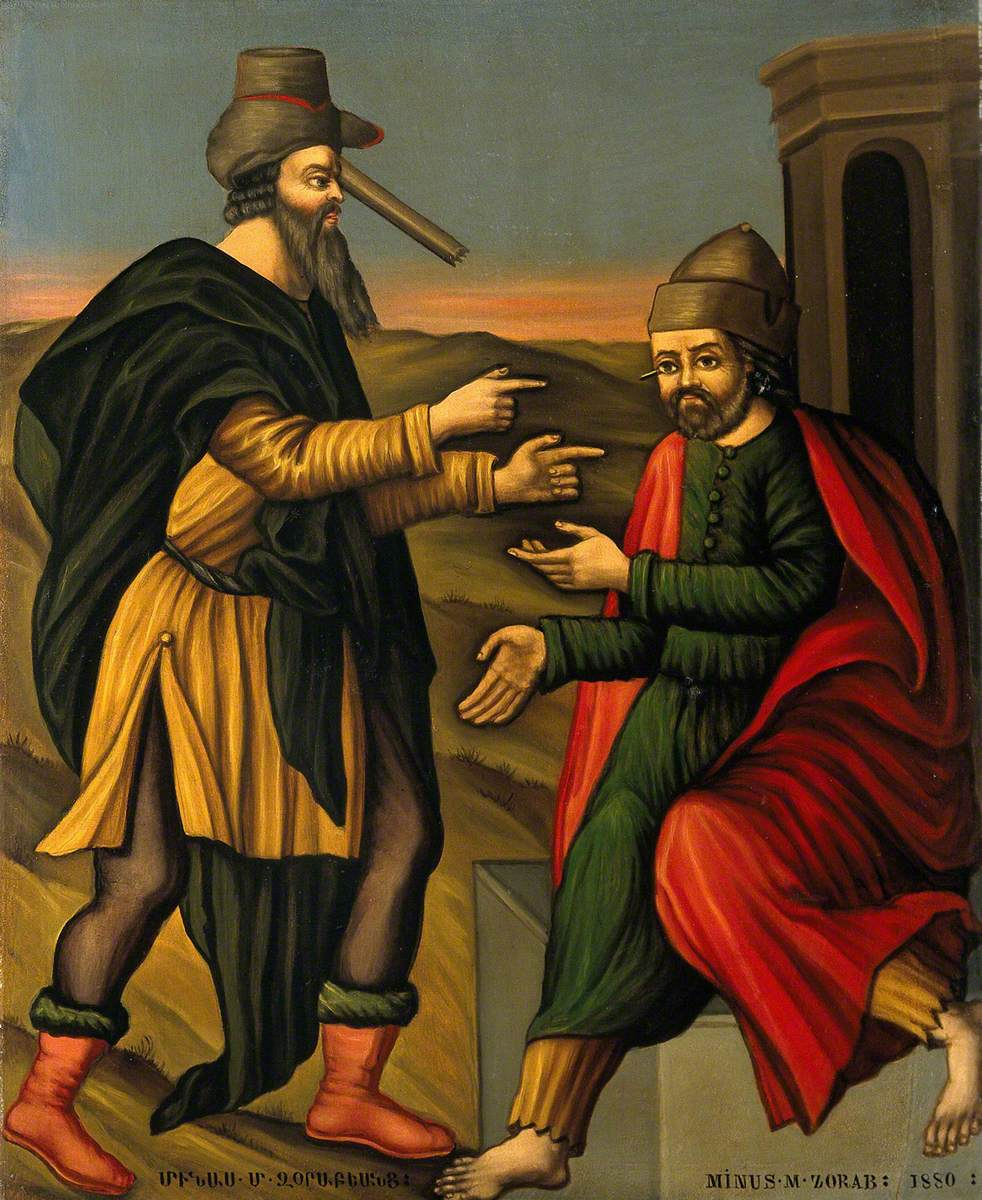
- Born: 1833; India
- Died: 1896 (aged 62–63)

Minus Megerdich Zorab or Minas Megerdich Zorab (1833–1896) was a successful painter. His work included icon's in Armenian churches in Iran.

== Life and heritage ==
Zorab was born in India to Manook Zohrab (a descendant of Zohrab I of Yerevan in Armenia) in 1833. His father had eight sons. One of his sons was Hoohanes Zorab who became known at Lt Colonel John Zorab. Zorab's father had dropped the "h" in the surname because it was confused with Parsees who had that name.

One of his paintings about The Mote and the Beam is in the Wellcome Trust and he is known for icons he painted in Armenian churches in Iran. The churches are in a suburb of Isfahan known as New Julfa.
