= Alain John =

British sculptor and navigator

- Born: Alain Jordan Clement John; 20 June 1920; Karachi, India
- Died: 23 December 1943 (aged 23); Surrey, England
- Resting place: West Norwood Cemetery
- Education: Blundell's School
- Notable work: Statue: Christ in Blessing in ruins of Coventry Cathedral
- Movement: Art Deco

Alain Jordan Clement John (20 June 1920 – 23 December 1943) was an aspiring sculptor of Armenian descent who joined the RAF as a navigator, and was killed during the Second World War. John is known for his statue of Christ in Blessing, which stands in the ruins of Coventry Cathedral in memory of those who died in World War II.

== Background of John and his statue ==
John was descended from an Armenian merchant family that had migrated from New Julfa, Persia to settle in Calcutta, India. Alain Jordan Clement John was born in Karachi. He was educated at Blundell's School in Tiverton for six years, and had passed the entrance to King's College in 1938 and was told he could travel abroad until term started. John instead chose to return to the School for a term to model a statue for an empty niche over the door in the School tower, "overlooking the quadrangle".

It was in 1938 that he commenced work on the model, intending it to be a figure of Peter Blundell who founded the school in 1604. He twice changed his mind, first to mould the clay into a likeness of St Peter. That did not satisfy him and he finally set to work on a model of Christ blessing the multitude.Western Morning News, 21 December 1943.

Eric Gill, then a master at the School, said of the clay model that "No finer piece of work has been done by anyone in this country this year". The original statue was completed by John, aged 18, working day and night, at Easter 1939, at a public house in Tiverton, Devon, having chosen to finish the sculpture rather than visit his parents in India. Cast in concrete, and "lengthened, like the great Chartres figures, the original work is 7 ft (2.13 m) high and remains in place, having stood in the niche at Blundell's since at least 1943.

== World War II ==
John enlisted with his friends at Euston for the RAF at some point after August 1940, preferring to fly with those friends as a Navigator Sergeant rather than seeking a commission. His service number was 1378473. He undertook a "long series of night flights over Germany", and died in Surrey from injuries sustained on a mission. Those of his friends from Blundell’s, who were with him on the raid, "returned unscathed".

== Cast of Christ in Blessing at Coventry ==
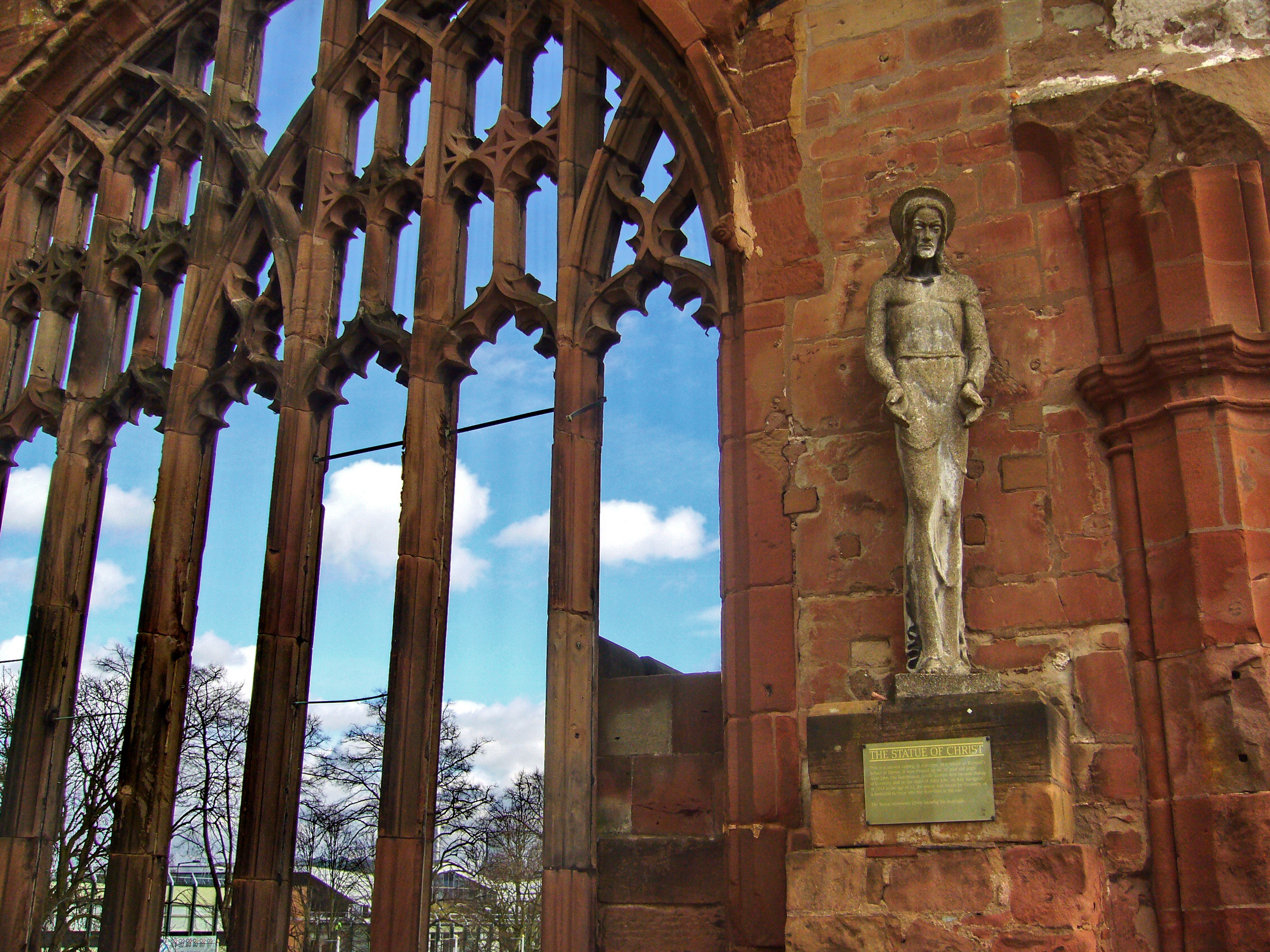
Christ in Blessing in the ruins of Coventry Cathedral

Neville Gorton, then Bishop of Coventry, wrote to the Times and other newspapers on 29 December 1943 to propose that John's statue be recast as an Air Force Memorial, commenting on the statue that "It is a moving work of faith and tenderness, and of the quality in its faith and its art Eric Gill’s judgement stands". The Air Ministry initially considered placing it in the Westminster Abbey memorial to The Few of the Battle of Britain.

The statue was subsequently re-cast at the commission of Neville Gorton and stands in the ruins of the old Coventry Cathedral as a memorial to those who lost their lives in the war.
