= List of Armenian churches in Iran =

This is a list of Armenian churches in Iran. Today there are more about 200 Armenian temples in modern Iran territory.

== Tehran ==
Picture	Church	Location	Date
	Surp Sarkis Mother Cathedral and Armenian Prelacy in Tehran		1970
	Surp Asdvadzadzin Church	Naderi Ave., North Qavam St.	1945
	Surp Thadevos - Bartołimevos	Tehran Grand Bazaar	1768
	Surp Gevork Church	Shahpur Ave.	1795
	Surp Minas Church	Vanak	1854
	Surp Vartanants Church	Sardarabad (Heshmatieh)	1986
	Surp Grigor Lusavoritch Church (fa)	Zeitoun (Majidieh)	1982
	Surp Tarkmantchats Church	Sassoun (Vahidieh)	1968
	Surp Hovhanness Chapel	Doulab Armenian Cemetery	1936
	Surp Stepanos Chapel (hy)	Nor Burastan Cemetery	1974
	Surp Khatch Chapel	Ararat Stadium, Vanak	1987
	Surp Grigor Lusavoritch Armenian Catholic Church	Ghazali St.	1955
SURP HOVHANNESS EVANGELICAL CHURCH	Surp Hovhannes (St. John's) Central Evangelical Church	Mirzaye Shirazi St. (Nader Shah Ave.)	1964
	Hokeshuntch Armenian Evangelical Church	Majidiyeh	
	Shnorhali Armenian Evangelical Church	Narmak Zarkesh	

== New Julfa, Isfahan ==
Picture	Church	Location	Date
	Surp Amenaprkich Cathedral (All Saviour's Cathedral) and Armenian Prelacy		1655
	Surp Katarine Convent	Charsou	1623
	Surp Gevork Church	Hakim Nezami Ave.	1611
	Surp Stepanos Church	Hakopjan	1614
	Surp Hovannes Mgrditch Church	Charsou	1621
	Surp Minas Church		1659
	Surp Nerses Church		1666
	Surp Grigor Lusavoritch Church		1633
	Surp Sarkis Church		1659
	Surp Hakop Mdzbena Church	Big Meidan	1607
	Surp Asdvadzadzin Church	Big Meidan	1613
	Surp Betłehem Church	Big Meidan	1628
	Surp Nikołayos Hayrapet Church		1630

== Northern Iran ==
=== West Azerbaijan ===
==== Salmas ====
Picture	Church	Location	Date
	Surp Asdvadzadzin Church (fa) (fa)	Akhtekhaneh	18th century
	Surp Hakop Church	Aslanik	1886
	Surp Gevorg Church	Charik	1203
	Surp Sarkis Zoravar Church (fa)	Drishk	1400
	Surp Sarkis Church	Qalasar	1806
	Surp Połos-Petros Church (fa)	Qezeljeh	
	Surp Hovhannes Church (fa)	Qezeljeh	1189
	Surp Asdvadzadzin Church	Haftvan	18th century
	Surp Gevorg Church	Haftvan	1652
	Surp Thadevos Church	Haftvan	13th century
	Surp Połos-Petros Church	Haftvan	
	Surp Sarkis Church (fa) (fa)	Khosrowabad	1717
	Surp Sarkis Church	Goluzan	18th century
	Surp Asdvadzadzin Church	Sheitanabad	1708
	Surp Gevorg Church	Payajuk	1751
	Surp Gevorg Church	Karabulagh	
	Surp Gevorg Church	Hodar	1813
	Surp Hakop Church (fa)	Kohneshahr	1671
	Surp Sarkis Church	Kohneshahr	1671
	Surp Hovhannes Church	Kohneshahr	1825
	Surp Sarkis Zoravar Church	Malham	1711
	Surp Vardan Church	Malham	1724
	Surp Chknavorats Church (fa)	Malham	1796
	Surp Sarkis Church	Saramolk	1758
	Surp Asdvadzadzin Church	Sarna	1625
	Surp Gevorg Church	Savera	18th century
	Surp Amenaprgitch Church	Zivajik	1892
	Surp Sarkis Church	Kojamish	1348
	Surp Sarkis Church	Ula	

==== Urmia ====
Picture	Church	Location	Date
	Surp Hovhannes Church	Balanej	17th century
	Surp Hovhannes Church	Badelbo	18th century
	Surp Sarkis Church	Surmanabad	18th century
	Surp Nshan Church	Jamalabad	18th century
	Surp Hovhannes Church	Jamalabad	18th century
	Surp Gevorg Church	Gardabad	early medieval
	Surp Sarkis Church	Ikiaghaj	17th century
	Surp Asdvadzadzin Church	Isalu	17th century
	Surp Asdvadzadzin Church	Karaguz	18th century
	Surp Hovhannes Church	Karaguz	18th century
	Surp Asdvadzadzin Church	Nakhichevan Tepe or Rahva	17th century
	Surp Asdvadzadzin Church	Reihanabad	17th century
	Surp Asdvadzadzin Church	Sepurghan	17th century
	Surp Sarkis Church	Sepurghan	17th century
	Surp Petros Church (fa)	Karabagh	1655
	Surp Hovhannes Church	Adeh	17th century
	Surp Asdvadzadzin Church	Dizej Ala	1820
	Surp Hovhannes Church	Khan Babakhan	17th century
	Surp Sarkis Church	Kachilan	17th century
	Surp Gevorg Church	Shirabad	18th century
	Surp Asdvadzadzin Church	Charbakhsh	1882
	Surp Połos-Petros Church	ChaharGushan	18th century
	Surp Asdvadzadzin Church	Ballu	17th century
	Surp Sarkis Church	Darbarud	18th century
	Surp Sarkis Church	Kukia	18th century
	Surp Asdvadzadzin Church	Babarud	18th century
	Surp Stepanos Church	Urmia	18th century

==== Khoy ====
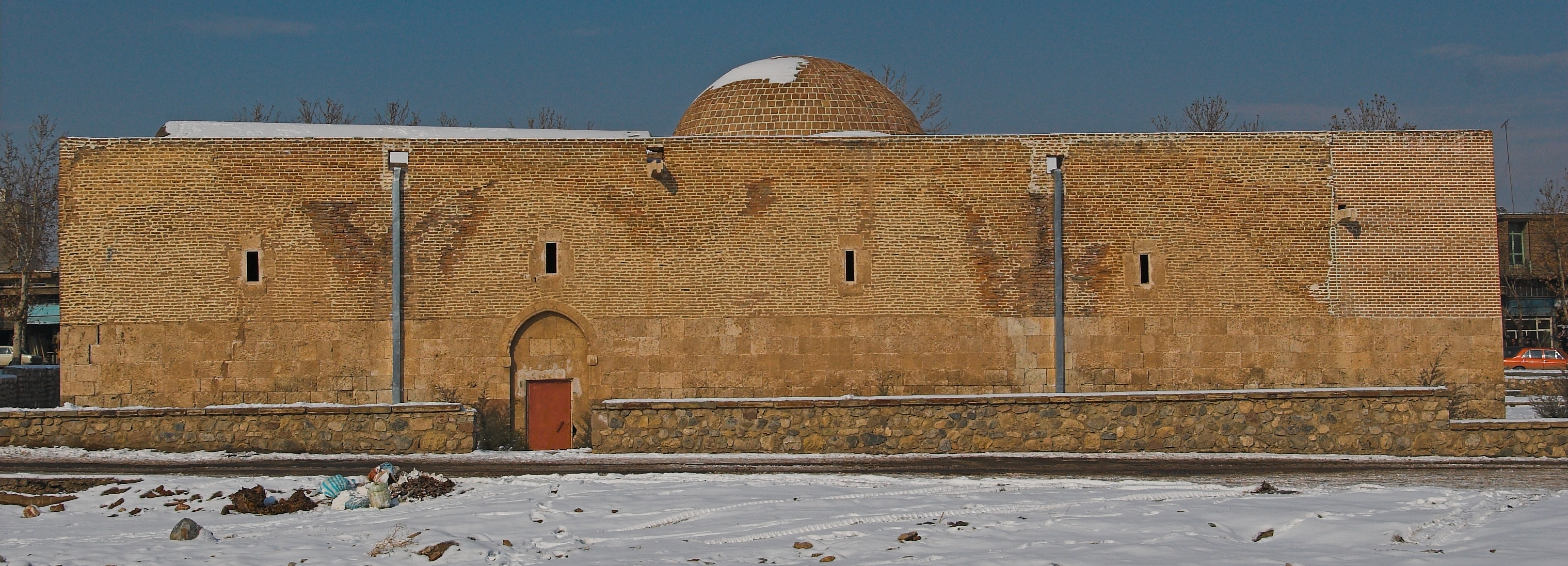
St. Sarkis Church, Khoy.

Picture	Church	Location	Date
Holy Cross of Christ Church, Mahlazan.	Surp Khatch Kristosi Church	Mahlazan	1656
	Surp Asdvadzadzin Church (fa) (fa)	Ghris	16th century
	Surp Sarkis Church (fa)	Fanai	16th century
	Surp Asdvadzadzin Church	Dizeh	18th century
	Surp Sarkis Zoravar Church	Var	18th century
	Surp Hakop Church	Saeedabad	18th century
	Surp Sarkis Church		1120

==== Maku ====
Picture	Church	Location	Date
	Surp Sandukht Church	Karakelisa	14th century
	Surp Vardan Church	Shaveran	18th century
St. Thaddeus Monastery.	Surp Thade Vank (Monastery of St. Thaddeus)	Karakelisa	Early Christianity (Renovated in 1329 and 1820)
Chapel of Dzordzor.	Surp Asdvadzadzin Chapel (Chapel of Holy Mary)	Baron (Dzor Dzor)	1324

==== Miandoab ====
Picture	Church	Location	Date
	Surp Sarkis Church	Taqiabad	

=== East Azerbaijan ===
==== Tabriz ====
Picture	Church	Location	Date
St. Hripsime Church, Mujumbar.	Surp Hripsime Church	Mujumbar	17th century
	Surp Varvare Church	Mujumbar	18th century
	Surp Anerevuyt Church	Mujumbar	1810
	Surp Hovhannes Church	Sohrol	19th century
	Surp Grigor Lusavoritch Church	Aljamolk	18th century
	Surp Petros Church	Minavar	
Surp Asdvadzadzin Church.	Surp Asdvadzadzin Church	Ghala, Tabriz	1782
St. Mary Church, Maralan, Tabriz.	Surp Asdvadzadzin Church	Maralan, Tabriz	18th century
	Surp Sarkis Church	Lilava, Tabriz	1821
Holy Shołakat Chapel, Tabriz.	Surp Shoghakat Church	Armenian Cemetery	1940

==== Julfa (Jolfa) ====
Picture	Church	Location	Date
St. Mary Church, Julfa.	Surp Asdvadzadzin Church	North of Jolfa	1518
	Surp Hovhanness Church	Upper Darashamb	18th century
	Surp Hovhanness Church	Upper Darashamb	18th century
	Surp Sarkis Church	Middle Darashamb	1828
	Surp Andreas Church	Middle Darashamb	1836
	Surp Gevorg Church	Lower Darashamb	1872
St. Stephen the Protomartyr Monastery, Julfa.	Surp Stepanos Nakhavga Vank or Małartavank (Monastery of St. Stephen the Protomartyr)	Upper Darashamb	10th century
Sheperd Church, Julfa.	Chapel of Chupan	North of Jolfa	

== Other Cities ==
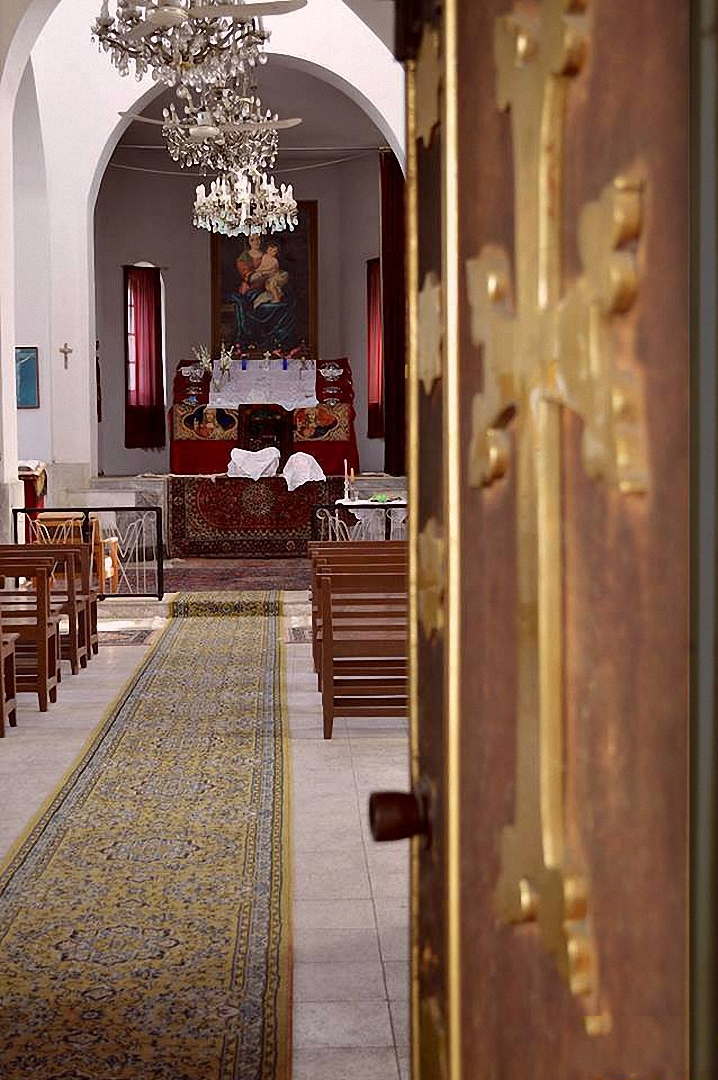
Surp Mesrop Church, Rasht

Picture	Church	Location	Date
	Surp Hovhanness Church (fa)	Maragheh	18th century
	Surp Asdvadzadzin Church (fa)	Ardabil	1876
	Surp Asdvadzadzin Church	Shiraz	1662
	Surp Gevork Church (fa)	Bushehr	1819
	Surp Asdvadzadzin Church (fa)	Bandar Anzali	1855
	Surp Mesrop Church (fa)	Rasht	1954
	Surp Hripsime Church (fa)	Qazvin	1936
	Surp Stepanos Church (fa) (fa)	Hamadan	1932
	Surp Mesrob Church (fa)	Arak	1914
	Surp Mesrob Church (fa)	Mashhad	1941
	Surp Gevork Church	Masjed-i-Suleiman	1942
	Surp Karapet Church	Abadan	1954
	Surp Mesrob Church (fa)	Ahwaz	1968

== See also ==
- Armenian Iranians
- New Julfa
