= St. Nicholas Church, New Julfa =

Iranian national heritage site

Saint Nicholas Church of New Julfa
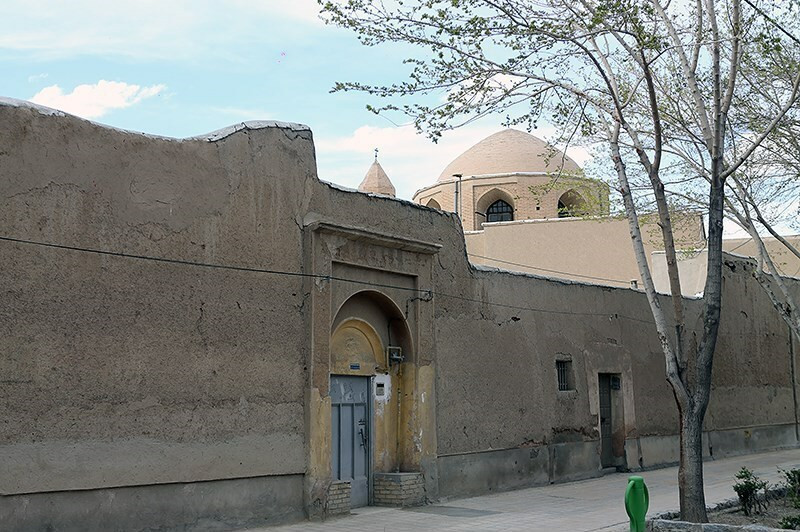
- Saint Nicholas Church of New Julfa

- Location within Iran

Religion
- Affiliation: Armenian Apostolic Church
- Rite: Armenian
- Status: Functioning

Location
- Location: New Julfa, Isfahan, Iran
- Coordinates: 32.63147832°N 51.64880723°E

Architecture
- Style: Isfahani
- Completed: 1630

Saint Nicholas Church of New Julfa, (Armenian: Նոր Ջուղայի Սուրբ Նիկողայոս Հայրապետ Եկեղեցի, Persian: کلیسای نیکوغایوس مقدس), is an Armenian Apostolic church in New Julfa, Iran. It is located in Gharagel neighbourhood of New Julfa.

== History ==
Saint Nicholas Church was built in 1630 and like St. John and St. Minas churches of New Julfa, was called St. Mary. It was renamed to St. Nicholas Church in 1779 when the right hand relic of St. Nicholas was brought here. In the courtyard, there is a chapel named after St. Stephen, built in 1774. There several tombstones in the courtyard, one of them belonging to Khoja Minas who was burnt alive by Nader Shah. The church has been renovated in 1916 and 1955.

== See also ==
- Iranian Armenians
- List of Armenian churches in Iran
