= Saint Hripsime Church (disambiguation) =

Saint Hripsime Church is a 7th-century Armenian Apostolic church in Vagharshapat, Armenia.

Saint Hripsime Church may also refer to:

- Saint Hripsime Church of Mujumbar, an Armenian Apostolic church in Mujumbar, Iran
- Saint Hripsime Church of Yalta, an Armenian Apostolic church in Yalta, Crimea
- Saint Hripsime Church of Vienna, an Armenian Apostolic church in Vienna, Austria
