= Saint John Church of Sohrol =

Iranian national heritage site

Saint John Church
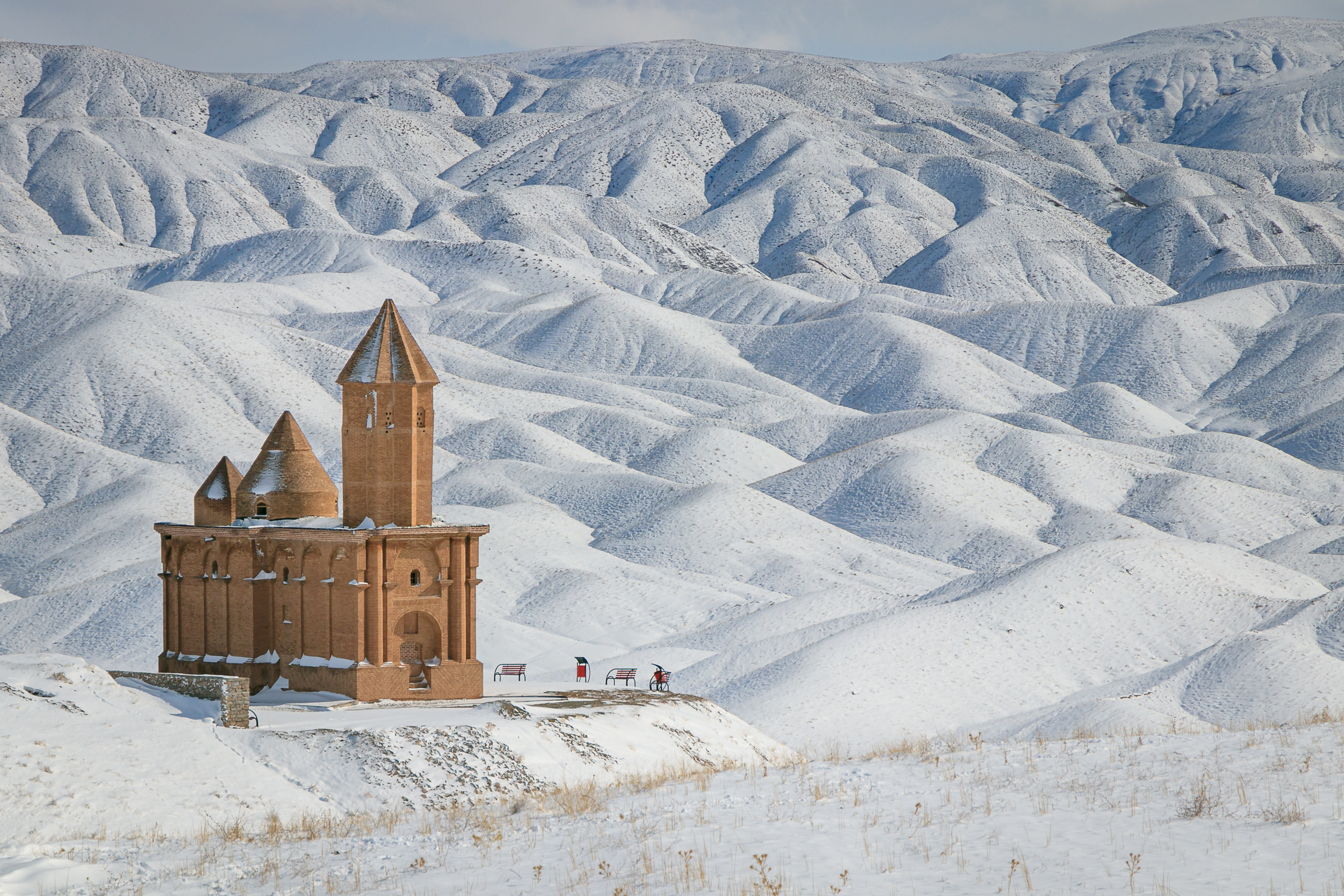
- Saint John Church in Sohrol

- Location within Iran

Religion
- Affiliation: Armenian Catholic Church
- Rite: Armenian
- Status: Abandoned

Location
- Location: Sohrol, Iran
- Coordinates: 38°18′00″N 46°11′52″E

Architecture
- Style: Armenian
- Completed: 5th or 6th century; rebuilt 1840

The Church of Saint John (Armenian: Սուրբ Յովհաննէս Եկեղեցի) is a 5th- or 6th-century Armenian Catholic church in Sohrol, Shabestar County, East Azerbaijan province, Iran. It was rebuilt in 1840 by Samson Makintsev (Sam Khan; member of the Bogatyr Battalion) in brick on the older church foundation.

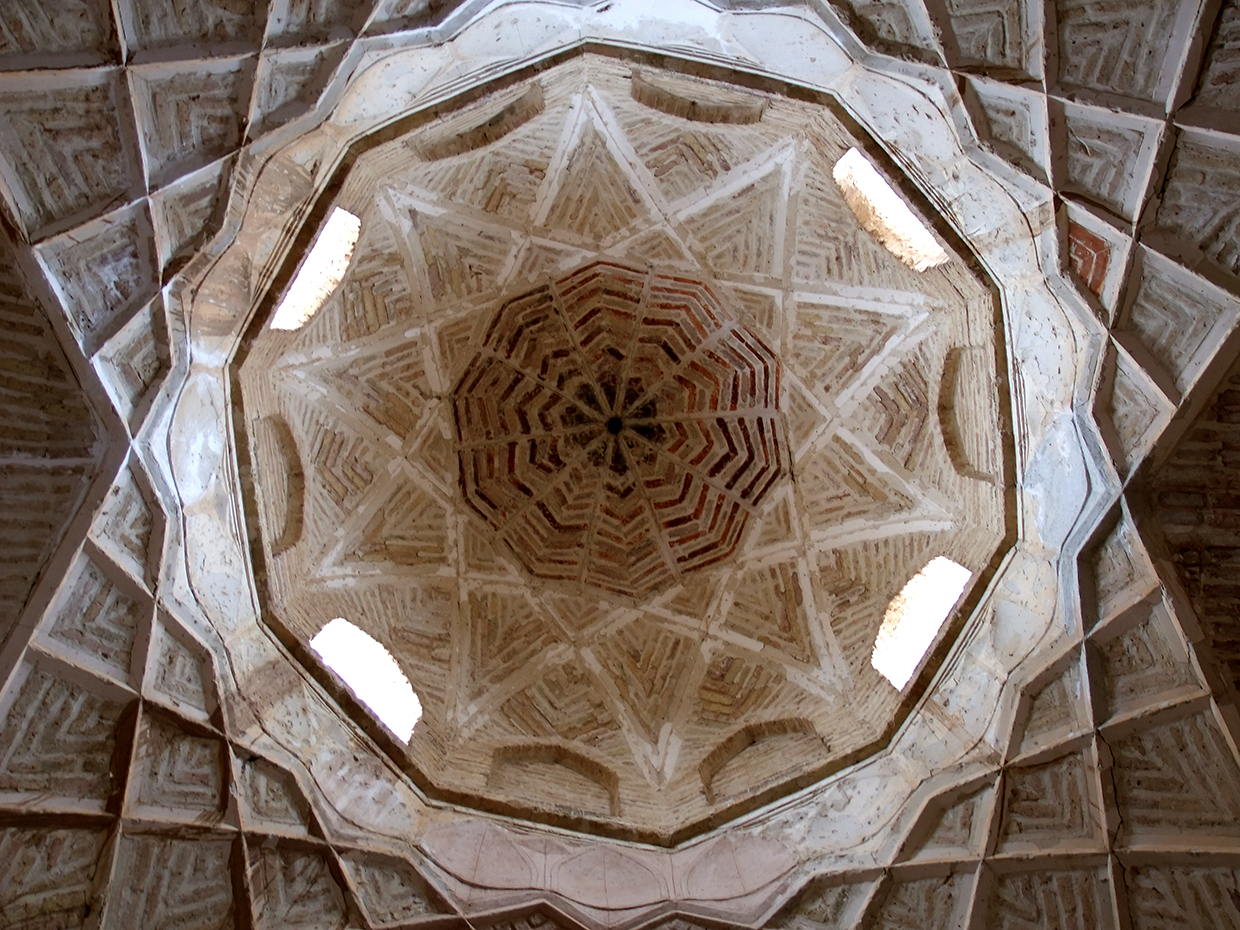
Interior of the church

== History ==
The modern Church of Saint John of Sohrol was built in 1840 over the ruins of the original, built either in the 5th or 6th century by Russian and French architects. In 1936, it was seriously damaged by an earthquake.

It was added to the Iran National Heritage List in 1968, with the registration ID 766. In 2020 it passed through restoration, with additional reinforcement being made in 2021.

== See also ==
- List of Armenian churches in Iran
