= St. John the Baptist Church, New Julfa =

Iranian national heritage site

Saint John the Baptist Church of New Julfa
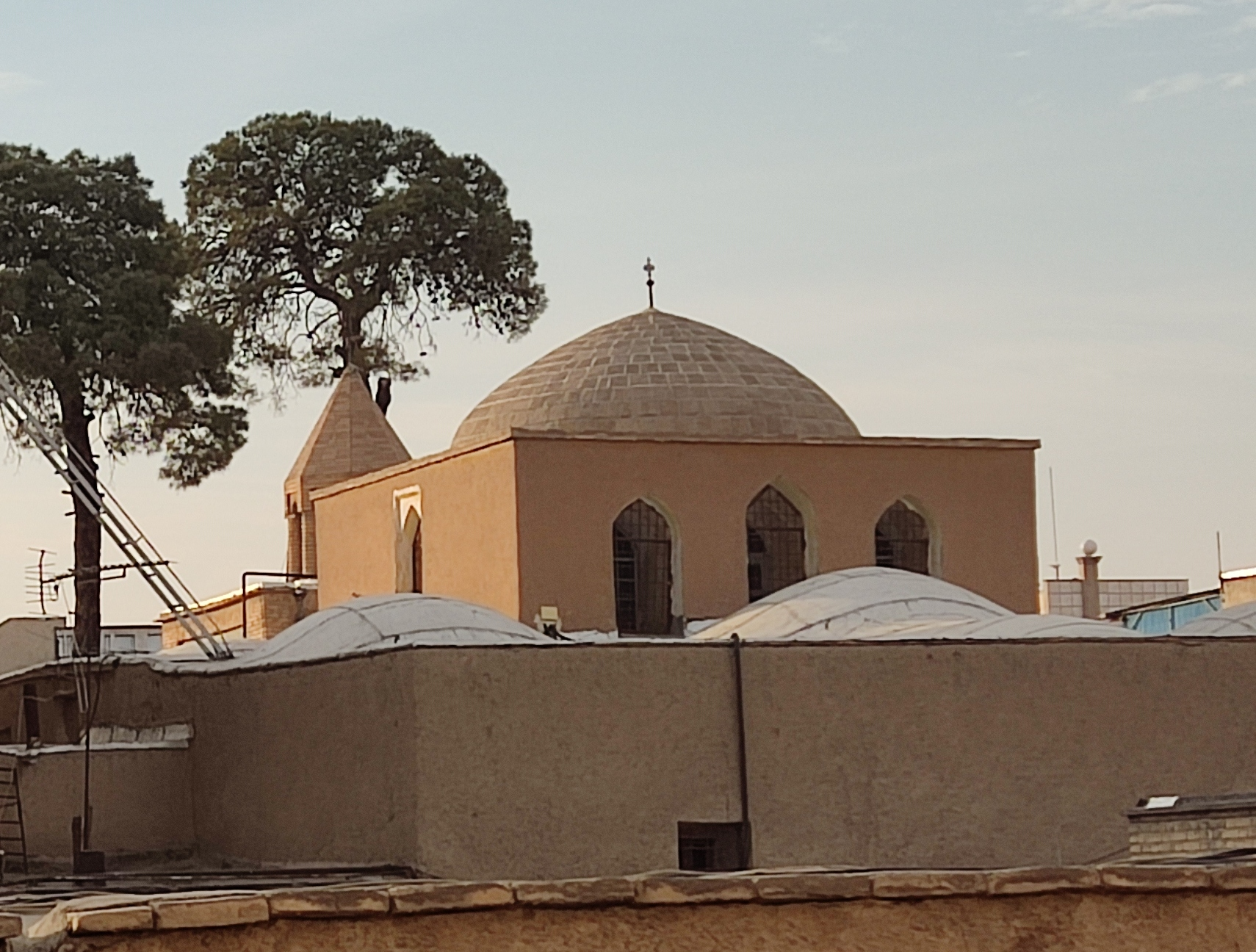

- Location within Iran

Religion
- Affiliation: Armenian Apostolic Church
- Rite: Armenian
- Status: Functioning

Location
- Location: New Julfa, Isfahan, Iran
- Coordinates: 32.63225084°N 51.65091544°E

Architecture
- Style: Isfahani
- Completed: 1621

Saint John the Baptist Church of New Julfa, (Armenian: Նոր Ջուղայի Սուրբ Յովհաննէս Մկրտիչ Եկեղեցի, Persian: کلیسای یوحنای تعمیددهنده), is an Armenian Apostolic church in New Julfa, Iran. It is located in Charsou neighbourhood of New Julfa, next to St. Catherine Convent.

== History ==
Saint John the Baptist Church was built in 1621. Originally, the church, like St. Nicholas and St. Minas churches of New Julfa, was called St. Mary. After bringing the left hand relic of St. John the Baptist there by Yeghiazar Amirasatens, the church was renamed to St. John the Baptist. Colloquially, it is called the Hand Church (Armenian: Աջի ժամ). There is a chapel built in 1774 in the north side of the courtyard and a belfry was built in 1841. The whole church was renovated in 1859.

== See also ==
- Iranian Armenians
- List of Armenian churches in Iran
