= St. George Church, Haftvan =

Church in Haftvan, Iranian national heritage site

Saint George Church
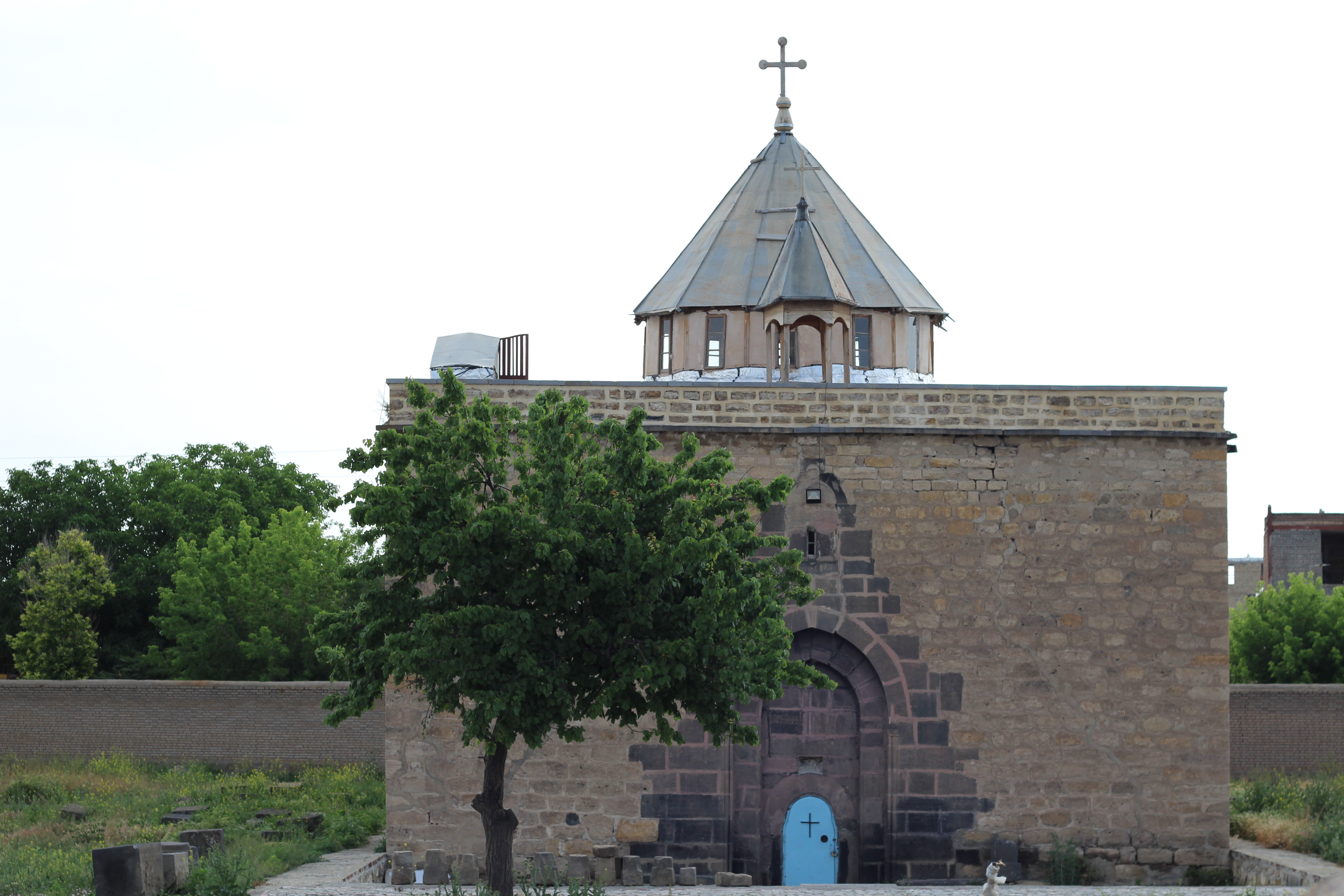
- Saint George Church in Haftvan

- Location within Iran

Religion
- Affiliation: Armenian Apostolic Church
- Rite: Armenian
- Status: Functioning

Location
- Location: Haftvan, Iran
- Coordinates: 38.169994°N 44.756462°E

Architecture
- Style: Armenian
- Completed: Thirteenth century

The Church of Saint George (Armenian: Սուրբ Գեւորգ Եկեղեցի) is a thirteenth-century Armenian Apostolic church in Haftvan, Salmas County, West Azerbaijan Province, Iran. It was renovated in 1652 and again after 1930 Salmas earthquake. There is a half-ruined auditorium nearby which was built in early twentieth century.

== Gallery ==
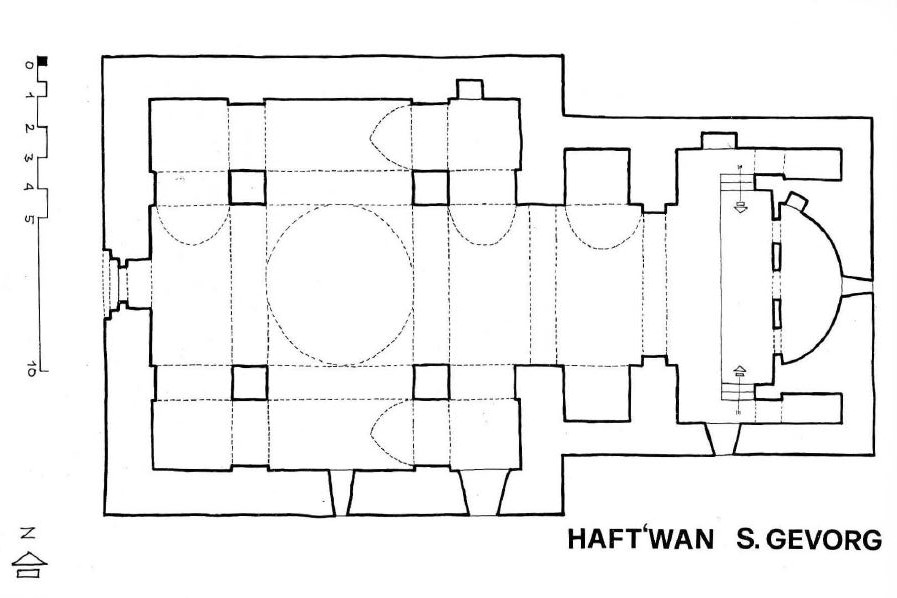
Floor Plan Created by Adriano Alpago Novello

== See also ==
- List of Armenian churches in Iran
