= St. Sarkis Church (Isfahan, Iran) =

Iranian national heritage site

Saint Sarkis Church of New Julfa
- Location within Iran

Religion
- Affiliation: Armenian Apostolic Church
- Rite: Armenian
- Status: Functioning

Location
- Location: New Julfa, Isfahan, Iran
- Coordinates: 32.63332151°N 51.6413936°E

Architecture
- Style: Isfahani
- Completed: 1659

Saint Sarkis Church of New Julfa, (Armenian: Նոր Ջուղայի Սուրբ Սարգիս Եկեղեցի, Persian: کلیسای سرکیس مقدس), is an Armenian Apostolic church in the Armenian quarter New Julfa of Isfahan, Iran.

== History ==
Saint Sarkis Church was built in 1659. It was originally named All Saviours Church. After devotion of relic of St. Nerses to this church in 1850s from the older St. Sarkis of New Julfa, it was renamed to St. Sarkis Church. There is a chapel Named St. Sthen built 1704. Also there are several tombstones in the courtyard, including one belonging to Gregory, a martyr.

== See also ==
- Iranian Armenians
- List of Armenian churches in Iran
