= Saint Hripsime Church of Mujumbar =

Iranian national heritage site

Saint Hripsime Church
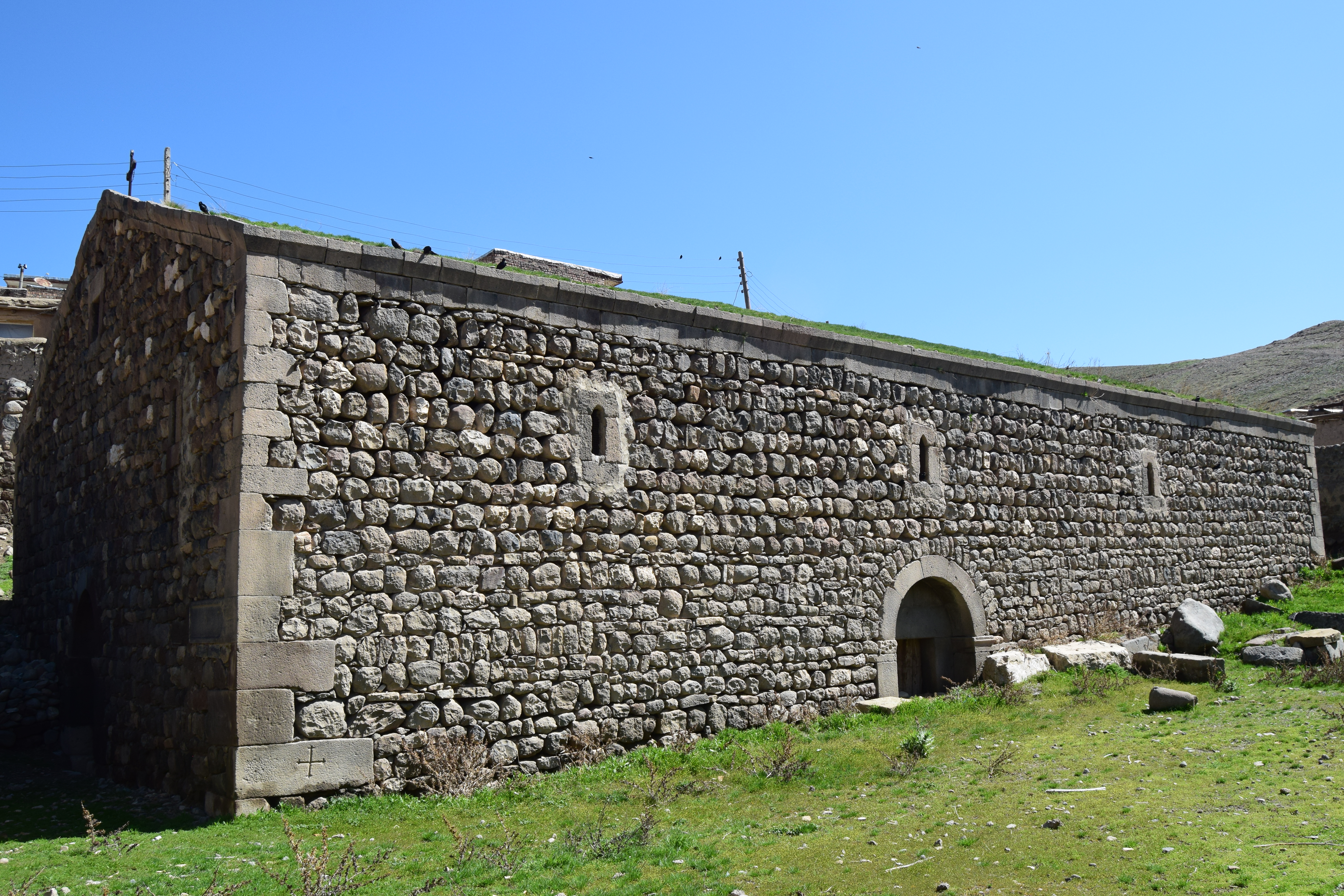
- Saint Hripsime Church in Mujumbar

- Location within Iran

Religion
- Affiliation: Armenian Apostolic Church
- Rite: Armenian
- Status: Abandoned

Location
- Location: Mujumbar, Iran
- Coordinates: 38°22′16″N 46°13′56″E

Architecture
- Style: Armenian
- Completed: 9th to 13th century

The Church of Saint Hripsime (Armenian: Սուրբ Հռիփսիմե Եկեղեցի) is a 9th- to 13th-century Armenian Apostolic church in Mujumbar, Shabestar County, East Azerbaijan Province, Iran. It was abandoned in 1947 when the Armenian population of Mujumbar moved to Tabriz or Soviet Armenia.

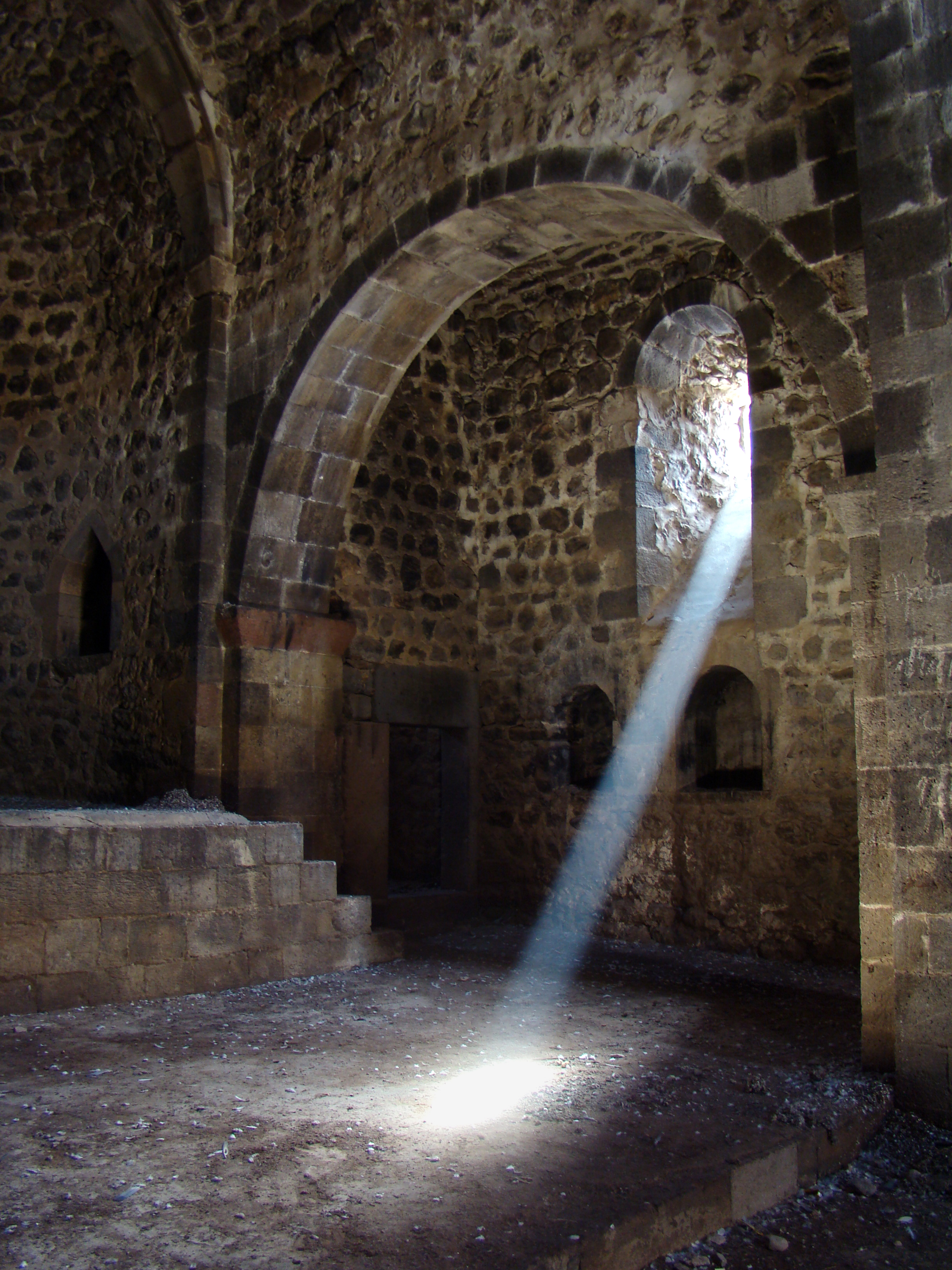
Interior of the church

== See also ==
- List of Armenian churches in Iran
