= St. Jacob Church, New Julfa =

Iranian national heritage site

Coordinates: 32.63605461°N 51.65792674°E

Saint Jacob of Nisibis Church of New Julfa
- Location within Iran

Religion
- Affiliation: Armenian Apostolic Church
- Rite: Armenian
- Status: Functioning

Location
- Location: New Julfa, Isfahan, Iran

Architecture
- Style: Isfahani
- Completed: 1607

Saint Jacob of Nisibis Church of New Julfa, (Armenian: Նոր Ջուղայի Հակոբ Մծբնա Հայրապետ Մատուռ, Persian: کلیسای هاکوپ مقدس), is an Armenian Apostolic church in New Julfa, Iran. It is located inside St. Mary Church and is considered the oldest surviving church in New Julfa.

== History ==
Saint Jacob Church was built in 1607. Later in 1613, a larger church, by the name of St. Mary Church, was built beside it. The church is currently used as a separate chapel inside St. Mary Church. There are a few stone crosses inside the church, the oldest of which is dated 1607. It was renovated in 1890.

== See also ==
- Iranian Armenians
- List of Armenian churches in Iran
