= St. Stephen Church, New Julfa =

Iranian national heritage site

Saint Stephen Church of New Julfa
- Location within Iran

Religion
- Affiliation: Armenian Apostolic Church
- Rite: Armenian
- Status: Functioning

Location
- Location: New Julfa, Isfahan, Iran
- Coordinates: 32.63577905°N 51.65010005°E

Architecture
- Style: Isfahani
- Completed: 1614

Saint Stephen the Protomartyr Church of New Julfa, (Armenian: Նոր Ջուղայի Սուրբ Ստեփանոս Նախավկա Եկեղեցի, Persian: کلیسای استپانوس مقدس), is an Armenian Apostolic church in New Julfa, Iran. It is located in Hakopjan neighbourhood of New Julfa.

== History ==
Saint Stephen Church was built in 1614 and is the largest church in New Julfa. There is a chapel by the name of St. Mary in the church. Between 1830 and 1890, there was a school in the church courtyard, named Holy Saviour School. There is tombstone of Manouk, son of Khoja Melkom, who was killed by Afghans in 1722 during the Siege of Isfahan.

== See also ==
- Iranian Armenians
- List of Armenian churches in Iran
