= St. Georg Church =

Iranian national heritage site

Saint George Church of New Julfa
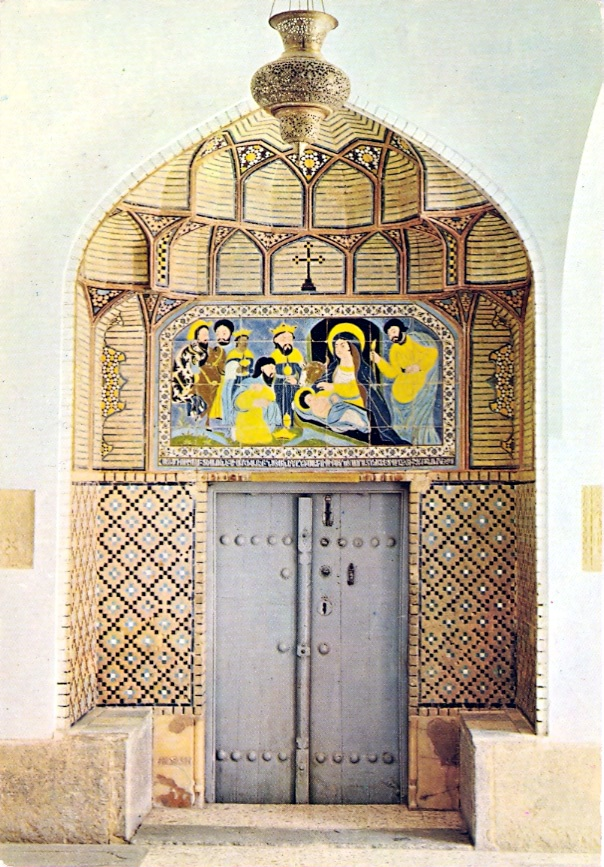

- Location within Iran

Religion
- Affiliation: Armenian Apostolic Church
- Rite: Armenian
- Status: Functioning

Location
- Location: New Julfa, Isfahan, Iran
- Coordinates: 32.63801968°N 51.65426284°E

Architecture
- Style: Isfahani
- Completed: 1611

Saint George Church of New Julfa or Gharib Church, (Armenian: Նոր Ջուղայի Սուրբ Գէորգ Եկեղեցի, Persian: کلیسای گئورگ مقدس), is an Armenian Apostolic church in New Julfa, Iran. It is the second-oldest church in New Julfa.

== History ==
Saint George Church was built in 1611. It is a famous place of pilgrimage for Armenians, as 15 pieces of stones were brought here from Etchmiadzin by the order of Shah Abbas I, so that the Armenians would not leave New Julfa and would not return to Armenia.The Safavid king, who tried to keep the Armenians in Isfahan by any means possible, and was aware of their deep religious beliefs, ordered to demolish the Etchmiadzin Cathedral and move its stones to Isfahan and rebuild that church in Julfa. Nevertheless, since this was not practical, only fifteen pieces of stone were removed from the altar and different parts of the church and transferred to Isfahan. The belfry was built in the 1920s and the church was renovated in 1959.

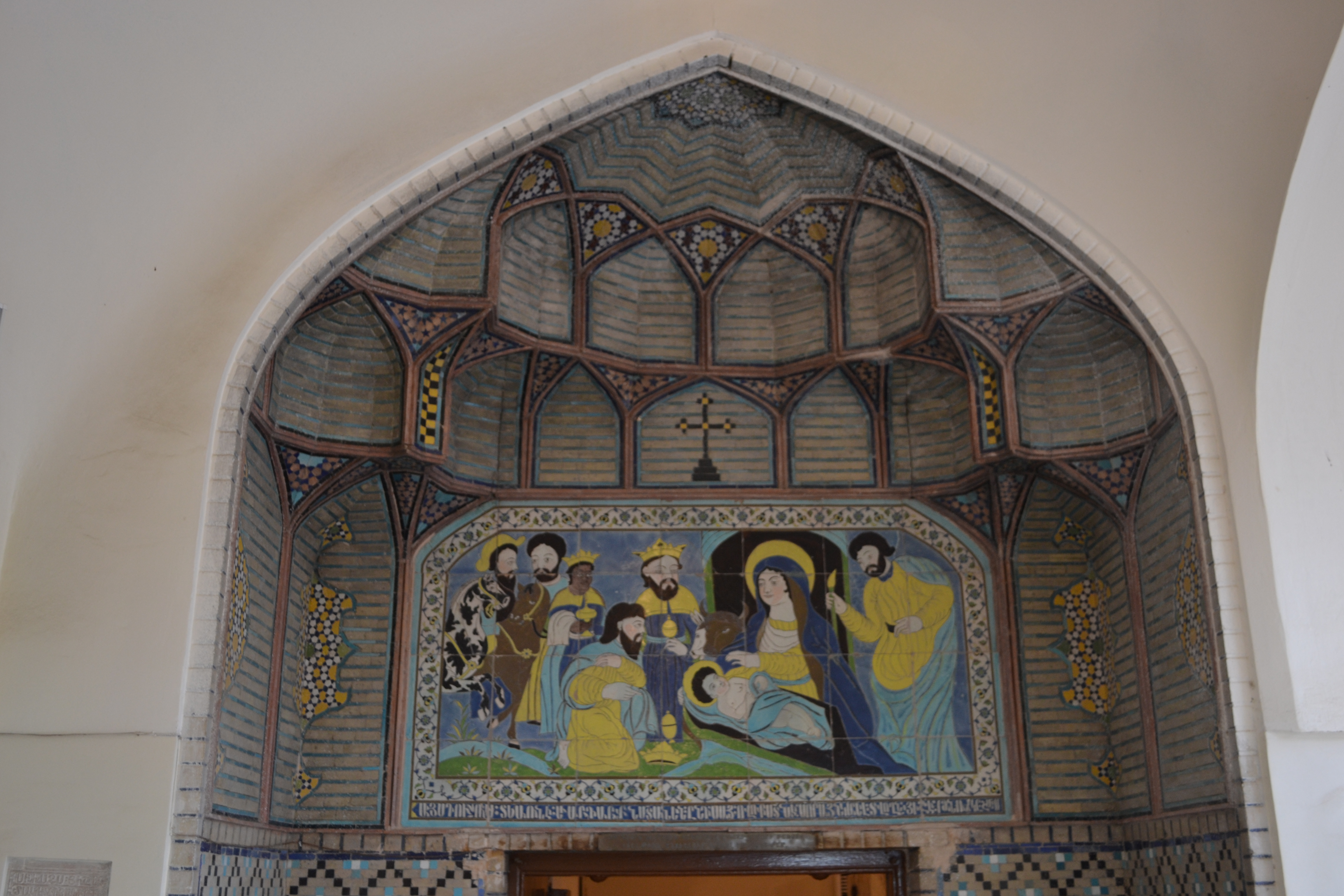
Entrance of the church

Three pieces of these stones with a carved cross in them were put in front of the altar and the rest were placed in the north courtyard of St. George's Church. Because these stones are sacred to Armenians, since then, St. George's Church has become a shrine for Armenians in Iran.

== Architecture ==
The church building has a rectangular plan in the east–west direction with dimensions of 26 x 11.6 meters and has three small arched domes. The domes and roof of the church are on arches which rest on three pairs of wide columns attached to the inner walls.

All three domes, the largest of which is the eastern dome, have skylights. The bell tower, founded in 1920, is located, on the roof, at the western end of the church.

The materials used in the church are brick and clay. The exterior walls of the building are covered with thatch and the interior walls are covered with plaster and on the inner walls, small decorations are drawn in the form of geometric lines.

== Photographs ==
- Inside chapel
- Inside chapel

== See also ==
- Iranian Armenians
- List of Armenian churches in Iran
- Armenian Apostolic Diocese of Isfahan and Southern Iran
