= Saint Minas Church of Tehran =

Iranian national heritage site

Coordinates: 35.76809554°N 51.39873952°E

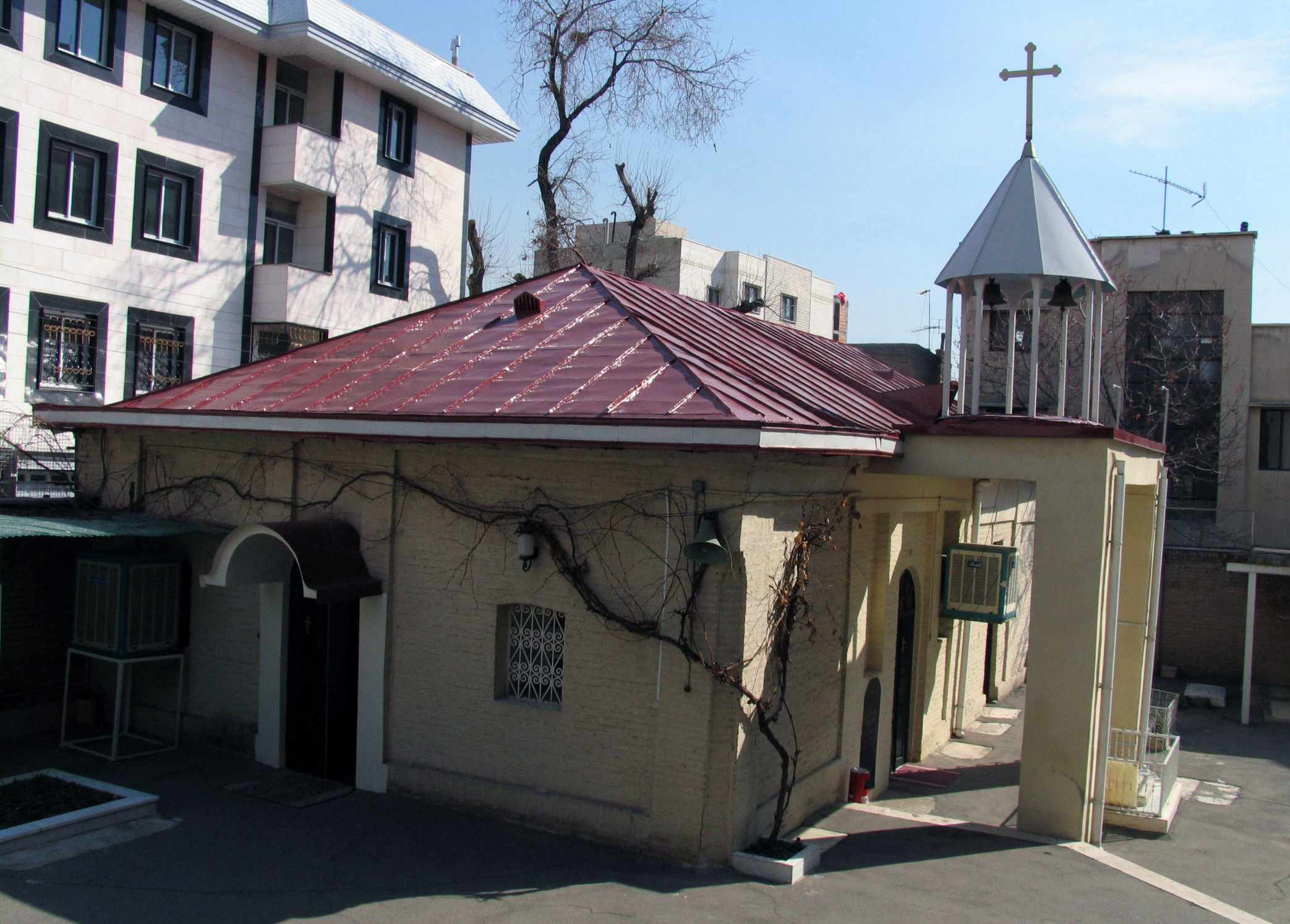
- Saint Minas Church of Tehran

- Location within Iran

Religion
- Affiliation: Armenian Apostolic Church
- Rite: Armenian
- Status: Functioning

Location
- Location: Vanak, Tehran, Iran

Architecture
- Style: Armenian
- Completed: 1856, rebuilt 1875

Saint Minas Church of Tehran, (Armenian: Սուրբ Մինաս եկեղեցի; Persian: کلیسای میناس مقدس), is an Armenian Apostolic church in Tehran, Iran.

== Location ==
It is located in the Armenian Fort (قلعه ارامنه), Ararat Street, in the northern suburb of Vanak in Tehran.

== History ==
In 1856, Mostowfi ol-Mamalek, funded the building of a small chapel for the Armenians in the Armenian Fort of the village of Vanak, which he had resettled from Chaharmahal (hy). The current building is from 1875. On the hill across the Armenian Fort, there used to be an Armenian cemetery that in mid-20th century, was replaced by the Ararat Stadium.

== Bibliography ==
- هوویان، آندرانیک (۱۳۸۰). «کلیساهای ارمنیان در ایران». ارمنیان ایران. تهران: مرکز بین‌المللی گفتگوی فرنگ‌ها با همکاری انتشارات هرمس. ص. ۱۵۴–۱۴۹.

== See also ==
- Iranian Armenians
- List of Armenian churches in Iran
