= Samson Makintsev =

General of Russian origin in the service of Qajar Iran

Samson Yakovlevich Makintsev Самсо́н Я́ковлевич Маки́нцев سامسون‌خان (Samson Khan)
- Born: 1780; Caucasian line Russian Empire
- Died: 1849 or 1853 (aged 68-73) Persian Empire
- Allegiance: Russian Empire; Persian Empire
- Service years: 1799 to 1802 For Russian imperial army 1802 to 1840 for Persian Imperial army
- Rank: Sergeant (Wachtmeister); Sartip (Brigadier general)
- Commands: Commander of Bogatyr battalion of Persian Imperial army
- Conflicts: Caucasian War; Russo-Persian War; Ottoman–Persian War; Revolt of Hasan Khan Salar

Samson Yakovlevich Makintsev (Russian: Самсо́н Я́ковлевич Маки́нцев), more commonly known as Samson Khan or Sam Khan (سامسون‌خان); (1849 – 1780), was a general of Russian origin in the service of Qajar Iran. Originally a sergeant of the Nizhny Novgorod Dragoon Regiment in the Imperial Russian Army, he deserted and became one of the many defectors who changed sides in the era of the Russo-Persian Wars.

== Biography ==
From at least the 19th century, and probably earlier, a steady stream of deserters from the Imperial Russian armies in the Caucasus fled to Iranian territory, sometimes surrendering to Iranian forces and entering Iranian service. Iran's then commander-in-chief, crown-prince Abbas Mirza, was eager to acquire and retain the services of as many Russian deserters as possible, because their military training was a useful asset to his new regular army. At first he used individual deserters to train his new regiments. As their numbers grew, he incorporated them into the Nezam regiments, and finally made them into a separate unit of their own.

One of the more notable deserters who enlisted in the Iranian service was Samson Yakovlevich Makintsev, a staff-trumpeter sergeant, who deserted from the Nizhni-Novgorod Dragoon Regiment in 1802, just before the start of the first Russo-Persian War of the 19th century (1804–1813). He was born in 1780 in the Caucasian Line of Ukrainian origin and was the child of a soldier. He joined the Dragoon regiment in 1799 at the age of 19. The service record of Lieutenant General V. V. Grushenko's Nizhni-Novgorod Dragoon Regiment for 1 January 1800 records the following information about Makintsev: "Samson Makantsov, Yakov's son. 19 years of age, height 2 arshins, 4 1/2 vershoks (162 cm). White face, light blond hair, grey eyes. Can read and write Russian. Unmarried. Taken into Major O. A. Kulikovskii's squadron as a dragoon on 14 September 1799, from the soldiers' children with the regiment who had attained adulthood." The reference to Makantsov as being of the "soldier's children" (soldatskie deti) meant that he was in fact part of a juridically defined social category stipulated in the Imperial Russian Petrine ranking system. According to the ranking system, the soldiers' children belonged to the military domain (voennoe vedomstvo) and were therefore destined for life in the military service. His membership in this social class probably also explains why he was literate, at a time when this was very uncommon for lower-ranking Russian soldiers. As a member of soldatskie deti, he would have been eligible to enter the special military schools and receive some education.

=== In Persia ===
Historian Stephanie Cronin states that the reason for his desertion is not definitely known, but the men of his regiment apparently believed that he had stolen the mouthpieces from the regiment's silver trumpets. After fleeing the regiment in 1802, then 22 years old, he gave himself up to the Iranians, entered Abbas Mirza's service, and was appointed a lieutenant in one of the new Nezam-e-Jadid (lit. "new army") regiments, the fawj-i-Erivan (the Erivan regiment), named after one of Iran's threatened Caucasian provinces.

Through his efforts, which included the enlisting of other fugitives into the ranks, Makintsev earned promotion to the rank of major. Soon one half of the Erivan regiment was made up of deserters. Seemingly having noticed Abbas Mirza's approval, the Russians expressed their dissatisfaction with the regiment's Iranian commander and to ask that he be replaced by Makintsev. Abbas Mirza, who was unwilling to place a mixed unit that included Muslim Iranians under direct Russian rule, instead formed the deserters into a separate unit, giving its command and the rank of colonel, and later general, to Makintsev, who took the name Samson Khan.

Makintsev quickly gained the complete confidence of Abbas Mirza, who gave the Russians the name Bahadoran (heroes) and used them to constitute his palace guard. The most reliable element in the Nezam-e-Jadid, they were better trained and more regularly paid than the native troops, and the king (Fath Ali Shah Qajar), and Abbas Mirza in particular, relied on them to suppress domestic rebellions. They were especially used in any issue related to "discontent with a religious flavour".

At first Makintsev recruited amongst the Russians whom he found in Tabriz – deserters, prisoners of war, and even runaway peasants. As Cronin notes, after his regiment suffered severe losses in the 1804–1813 Russo-Persian War, Makintsev started an active approach. Not waiting for deserters to arrive in Tabriz of their own accord, he made every effort to encourage the flight of soldiers in the Russian army then occupying the Iranian territory that is modern-day Azerbaijan. He employed a range of methods, including "enticements, money and cunning", and he organized schemes to encourage troops to desert their Russian units. Persuasion was tried first, and then Makintsev's men would ply the Russians "with wine and seize them".

The reputation of Makintsev, now with the rank of general, as a trusted soldier of the crown prince and commander-in-chief, Abbas Mirza, and the welcome awaiting for those who deserted by this time well known among the Russian troops, led to a constant stream of deserters. Several hundred Russian prisoners of war were also enlisted into the Bahadoran regiment of the Nezam-e Jadid. Cronin notes that as time passed, the sons of deserter-troops who had married in Iran were, in a continuation of the Russian practice, also enlisted into the regiment.

The strength of the regiment fluctuated. In 1822 they were estimated to number 800–1,000 troops, but after the second Russo-Persian War (1826–1828) it was reported that there were as many as 3,000. In 1833 alone, 400 new deserters arrived from Russia. Compared to the native Nizam troops, this was a comparatively substantial number, which, though also fluctuating and uncertain, probably amounted to around 12,000 by the early 1830s, according to Cronin. Some decided to settle permanently in Iran, integrating into local society, their habitual drunkenness apparently presenting no impediment to social acceptance. Some yearned to return home, but many married and established families. Makintsev himself married and had children, and those who married were given land and apparently lived well. Makintsev inhabited a large house in the Tabriz arg (citadel), having made an extremely advantageous marriage to the daughter of the exiled Prince Alexander of Georgia who was living in Iran proper as well.

Makintsev's regiment was the fighting core of the Nizam-i-Jadid, and appears to have possessed considerable combat power. During the Russo-Persian War of 1804–1813, Makintsev's regiment fought at the decisive Battle of Aslanduz in October 1812. Though overall a disaster for the Iranians, the deserters under Makintsev appear to have engaged the troops under General Pyotr Kotlyarevsky with some success, reportedly nearly annihilating them. Kotlyarevsky on the other hand acted quickly to take revenge, for the deserters amongst the prisoners were hanged and bayoneted. By the time of the 1826–1828 war, the deserters had developed qualms, and Makintsev tried to avoid a direct confrontation in the fighting, declaring that the "Russians had sworn on the Holy Gospel that they would not fire on fellow Christians". Abbas Mirza, however, was determined to use his expertise and made him his military adviser, and the regiment subsequently went on campaign on the condition that it would be kept in reserve, though it eventually was involved in military operations. After the campaign, Makintsev retired from active service. He then appointed his new son-in-law, Yevstafii Vasilievich Skryplev, a non-commissioned officer recently deserted from the Nasheburg infantry regiment, the new colonel and regimental commander.

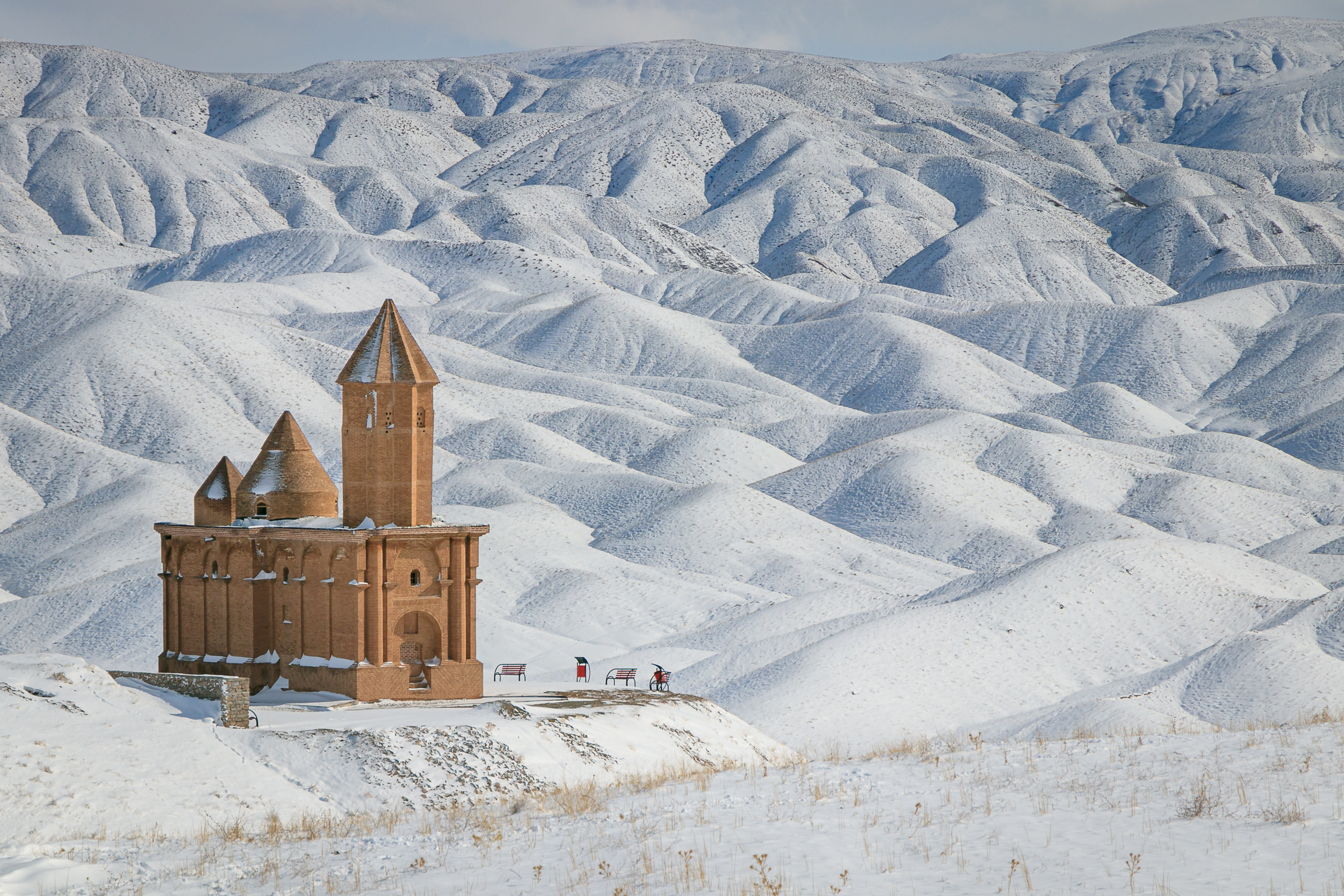
Saint John Church of Sohrol

Russia had been making extensive efforts and appeasement policies for years towards the deserters to repatriate them, with, eventually, relatively high success. Makintsev himself declined the offer, however, apparently out of fear that he would be treated differently from the other deserters, tried separately, and punished. He died in 1849 and was buried under the altar of an Armenian Catholic church (Saint John Church of Sohrol) in Iranian Azerbaijan that he himself had rebuilt in 1840.

By the early 1850s the deserter regiment of which Makintsev had once been part had vanished, its remnants in Iran absorbed into the native Nizam units.

== Issue ==
Samson Khan married three times;

1. an Armenian from the village Kizyldzha near Salmas of the Khoy Khanate. Samson killed her later for infidelity.
2. Yelizaveta – a daughter of Prince Aleksandre of Georgia.
3. unknown – died childless.

Children;

From the first marriage, he had three daughters. From the second, he had a son, Jebrail, and a daughter, Anna. His son Jebrail later served as an aide-de-camp to Shah Naser al-Din, and was known by the name of Jebrail Khan.

== See also ==
- Russo-Persian War (1804-1813)
- Russo-Persian War (1826-1828)

== Sources ==
- Cronin, Stephanie (2013). Iranian-Russian Encounters: Empires and Revolutions Since 1800. Routledge. ISBN 978-0415624336.
- Kibovskii, Aleksandr (1996). ""BAGADERAN" - RUSSIAN DESERTERS IN THE PERSIAN ARMY, 1802-1839". Tseikhgauz. Archived from the original on 2017-07-05.
- Lepyokhin, Mikhail (2000). Русский биографический словарь, т. 8 [Russian Biographical Dictionary, vol. 8] (in Russian). Moscow: Aspekt Press. ISBN 5-7567-0079-X.
- Берже А. П. Самсон-хан Макинцев и русские беглецы в Персии 1806-1853 гг. // Русская старина. – Т. 15, No. 4 (апрель). – С. 775. (in Russian)
