= St. Gregory the Illuminator Church, New Julfa =

Iranian national heritage site

Saint Gregory the Illuminator Church of New Julfa
- Location within Iran

Religion
- Affiliation: Armenian Apostolic Church
- Rite: Armenian
- Status: Functioning

Location
- Location: New Julfa, Isfahan, Iran
- Coordinates: 32.6354312°N 51.65342599°E

Architecture
- Style: Isfahani
- Completed: 1633

Saint Gregory the Illuminator Church of New Julfa, (Armenian: Նոր Ջուղայի Սուրբ Գրիգոր Լուսավորիչ Եկեղեցի, Persian: کلیسای گریگور لوساووریچ مقدس), is an Armenian Apostolic church in New Julfa, Iran. It is located in Small Meidan neighbourhood of New Julfa.

== History ==
Saint Gregory the Illuminator Church was built in 1633 by Khoja Minas. There are many khachkars in the church, some of which date back to 1641, 1643 and 1646. The church has a summer or outdoor chapel built in 1714, by Khoja Minas grandson. There are some tombstones in the courtyard, two of which are related to the founder of the church and the killings by Afghans in 1722.

== See also ==
- Iranian Armenians
- List of Armenian churches in Iran
