= Yevstafii Skryplev =

Russian military officer

Yevstafii Vasilievich Skryplev Евстафий Васильевич Скрыплев
- Born: Russian Empire
- Died: Early 1860s Russian Empire
- Military career
- Allegiance: Russian Empire (until 1828); Sublime State of Iran (1828–39); Russian Empire (upon return in 1839)
- Branch: Imperial Russian Army; Qajar Iranian Army (from 1828); Imperial Russian Army (upon return in 1839)
- Rank: Officer (up to 1828); Commander (1828–39); Yesaul (upon return), Ataman (upon return)
- Units: Infantry, Cavalry
- Commands: Bogatyr battalion Russian battalion of the Iranian army Chamlyksk Cossack settlement
- Conflicts: Numerous domestic engagements in Qajar Iran; Caucasian War

Yevstafii Vasilievich Skryplev (Russian: Евстафий Васильевич Скрыплев) was a Russian military officer who defected to Qajar Iran, where he became commander of the Bogatyr battalion of the Qajar army. Upon repatriation to Russia, he became a successful Cossack commander in the Caucasian Host, eventually gaining the rank of ataman as well.

== Biography ==
Not much is known regarding Skryplev's early life. Before his defection, he was a non-commissioned officer in the Nasheburg infantry regiment. In 1828, he moved to the Iranian camp. He entered the shah's service and married the daughter of Samson Makintsev, better known as Samson Khan, a Russian commander that had defected to the Iranians some years earlier. Makintsev made his son-in-law a colonel and commander of the Bogatyr battalion of Russian deserters. Being already a general, he himself took the battalion's honorary position of colonel-in-chief, as he had decided to retire from active service following the Russo-Iranian War of 1826–1828.

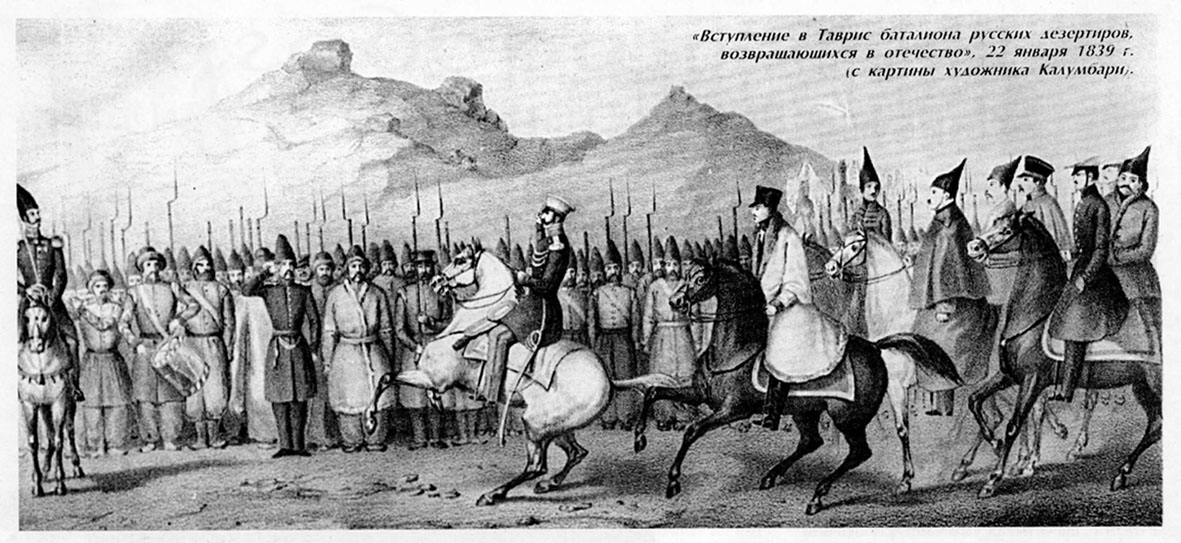
"Entry into Tabriz of the battalion of Russian deserters returning to the fatherland, January 22, 1838." Painted by F. Colombari.

After the Bogatyr battalion on insisting policies of the Russian government was eventually disbanded, which had included the extensive encouragement of repatriation, as well as a proclamation of general amnesty by Tsar Nicholas I himself, many of its Russian soldiers were eventually forced to move back to the Russian territories with their families. Yevstafii – Makintsev's successor in the Iranian ranks as head of the Bogatyr battalion – was pardoned too, and thus he repatriated as well. On December 6, 1838, the battalion celebrated the name day of Nicholas I. According to historian Aleksandr Kibovskii, Skryplev was overcome by the ceremony and decided to go to Russia. This news stunned Samson Khan, and his daughter – the pregnant wife of Skryplev – miscarried out of fear, but followed her husband. On December 22, the battalion marched out of Tehran and arrived in Tabriz in exactly one month. The battalion stayed 15 days in Tabriz, collecting the families of the deserters, after which it went on further. On February 11, 1839, the battalion crossed the Russian border singing and with drums beating, and it conducted a prayer service for its safe exit from Iran. On March 5, the deserters arrived in Tbilisi. Overall, 1084 individuals came out of Iran; 597 "bogatyrs", 206 women, and 281 children. Those who remained continued in the military service of the Iranian monarch, but no longer formed an independent unit.

Among the returned deserters, the married men were enrolled in the Caucasian Line Cossack Host and settled in Cossack villages. The unmarried men were assigned to Finnish line battalions and the Archangel Garrison Battalions, with their years in Iranian service counted as being in the Russian army. Thirty old and decrepit men were released to their motherland. The Polish officers went home. All those who had converted to Islam received church dispensation of their "renunciation of the faith, caused by long sojourn in Iran and extreme circumstances".

Skryplev was fully pardoned, became a sotnik (Cossack lieutenant) in the Caucasian Host and settled in the Lana line. There, he eventually rose to the rank of yesaul (Cossack captain), as a result of his bravery in operations against the Caucasian mountaineers, and became ataman of the Chamlyksk Cossack settlement. Thus, the other former Russian deserters from Iran in the Caucasian Voiska continued regarding him as their leader, his word being "absolute law for us Iranian Cossacks". By the end of his life, his eyesight had begun to fail, supposedly because of his "constant use of henna to colour, Iranian-style, his eyebrows and eyelids". According to Kibovskii, he died in the early 1860s.

The Iranian intimate knowledge and experiences of Skryplev and other deserters gained thereby of the kind of society that the Russian Empire was attempting to conquer and annex, and made them an ideal for integration into the Cossack Voiska planted into Muslim territories. The life of Skryplev back in Russia, Makintsev's son-in-law and his successor as colonel of the regiment, provides a vivid illustration of the ease with which the deserters abandoned and embraced different roles and loyalties.

== Sources ==
- Cronin, Stephanie (2013). Iranian-Russian Encounters: Empires and Revolutions Since 1800. Routledge. ISBN 978-0415624336.
