= St. Vartanants Church =

St. Vardanants Church
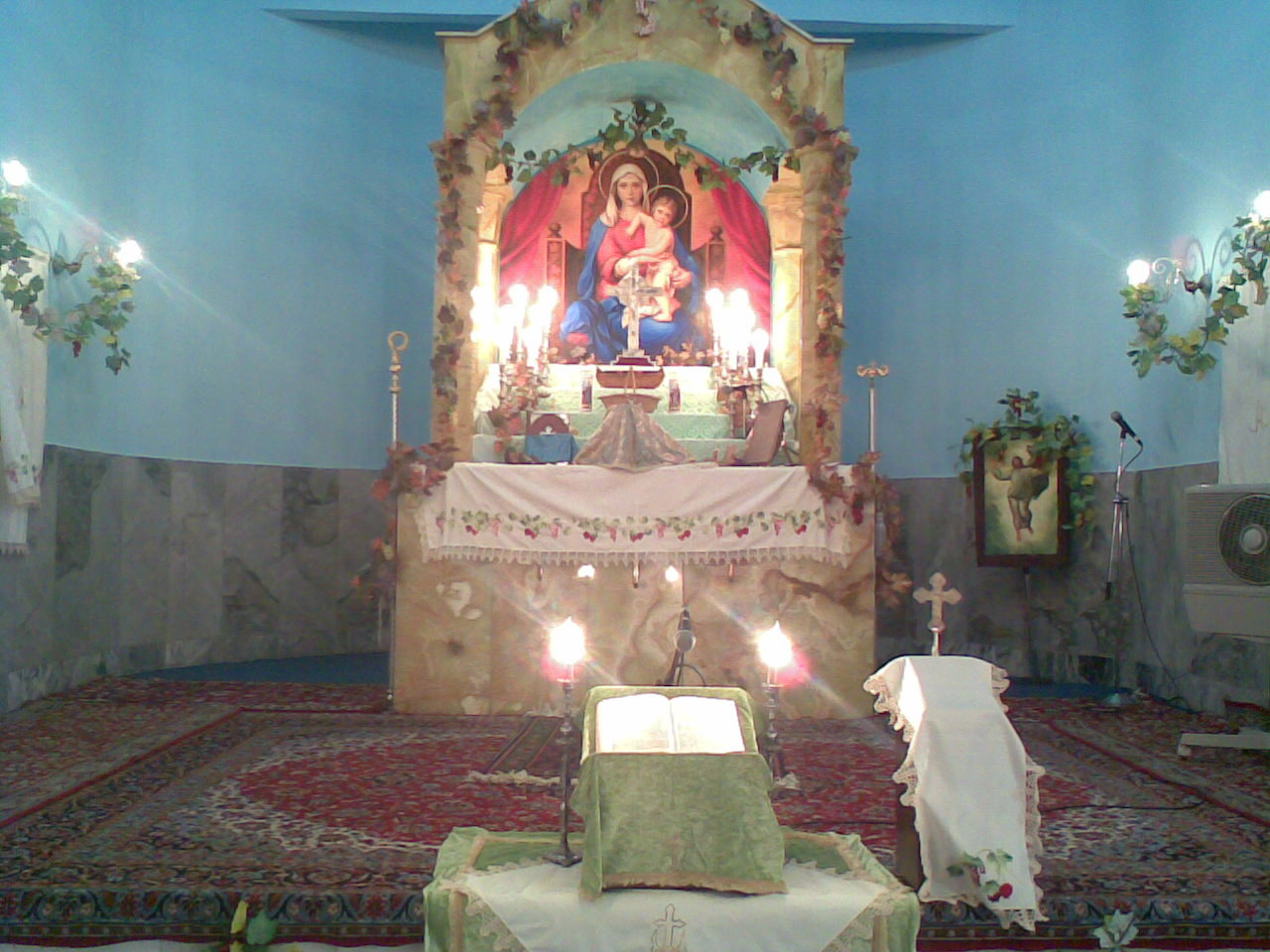
- Interior of the church

- Location within Iran

Religion
- Affiliation: Armenian Apostolic Church
- Province: Tehran Province

Location
- Location: District 7, Tehran, Iran

Architecture
- Type: Church
- Completed: 1986

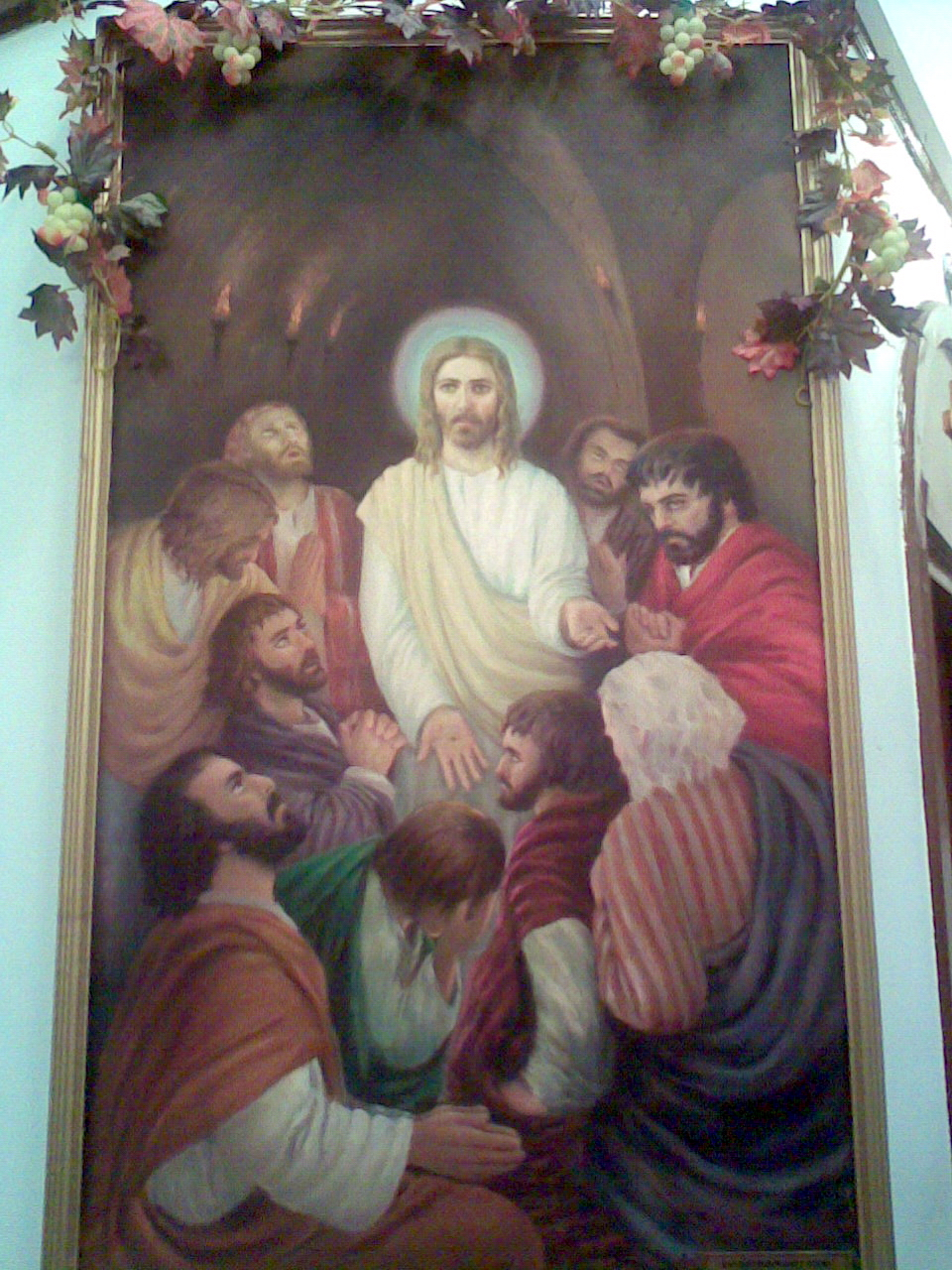

St. Vartanants Church ("Serpots Vartanants" in Armenian) (Armenian: Սրբոց Վարդանանց Եկեղեցի) is established in 1986 and was anointed as an Armenian Apostolic Church in 1987 at Tehran. St. Vartanants Church is the last Armenian or Christian church which was built in Iran.

== Size and location ==
St. Vardanants Church is located at Dah Metri Aramaneh Avenue (next to Khahe Nezam Ol Molk Street) in Heshmatiyeh, which is called by Armenians Sardarabad (named after the Battle of Sardarapat).

The church building has an area of 250 square meters on a plot of land with an area of 400 square meters. It is 39.70 meters long and 10.10 meters wide.

== History ==
The formation of the Armenian community in Heshmatiyeh (like the other Armenian-populated districts of Tehran) began in the late 1940s. In earlier time there was the Saint Gregory the Illuminator chapel located in a place where today is the "Shahaziz" Sports and Cultural Union. It was destroyed by fire in 1967.

At beginning when the community was strong in number and there was no church in this area, so therefore they felt to have a church in their locality which was a need for survival of the community in this area. There was a school named “Sahakian” in Dahmetri Aramane Ave. and the school had a hall for religious ceremonies which was large in size. Since there was no land in the area to build a church, so the school hall was modified into a church. With the help of the Armenian Prelacy of Tehran and certain circumstances that was caused after Iranian revolution, the church was finally established and then anointed on 13 June 1986.

The church was named after an Armenian saint named Vartan from the 5th century who was martyred for the sake of the faith in Christ. Vardan Mamikonian fought the Battle of Avarayr against Sassanid army in defense of his faith and people. St. Vartan fought with handful number of small army against Sassanid army who were outnumbered than Armenia's army. Physically the battle was lost and St. Vartan with all his men in arms was martyred but in long run they won the battle morally in honor and dignity. St. Vartan is one of important saints in Armenian Church and for the whole Armenian people all around the world.

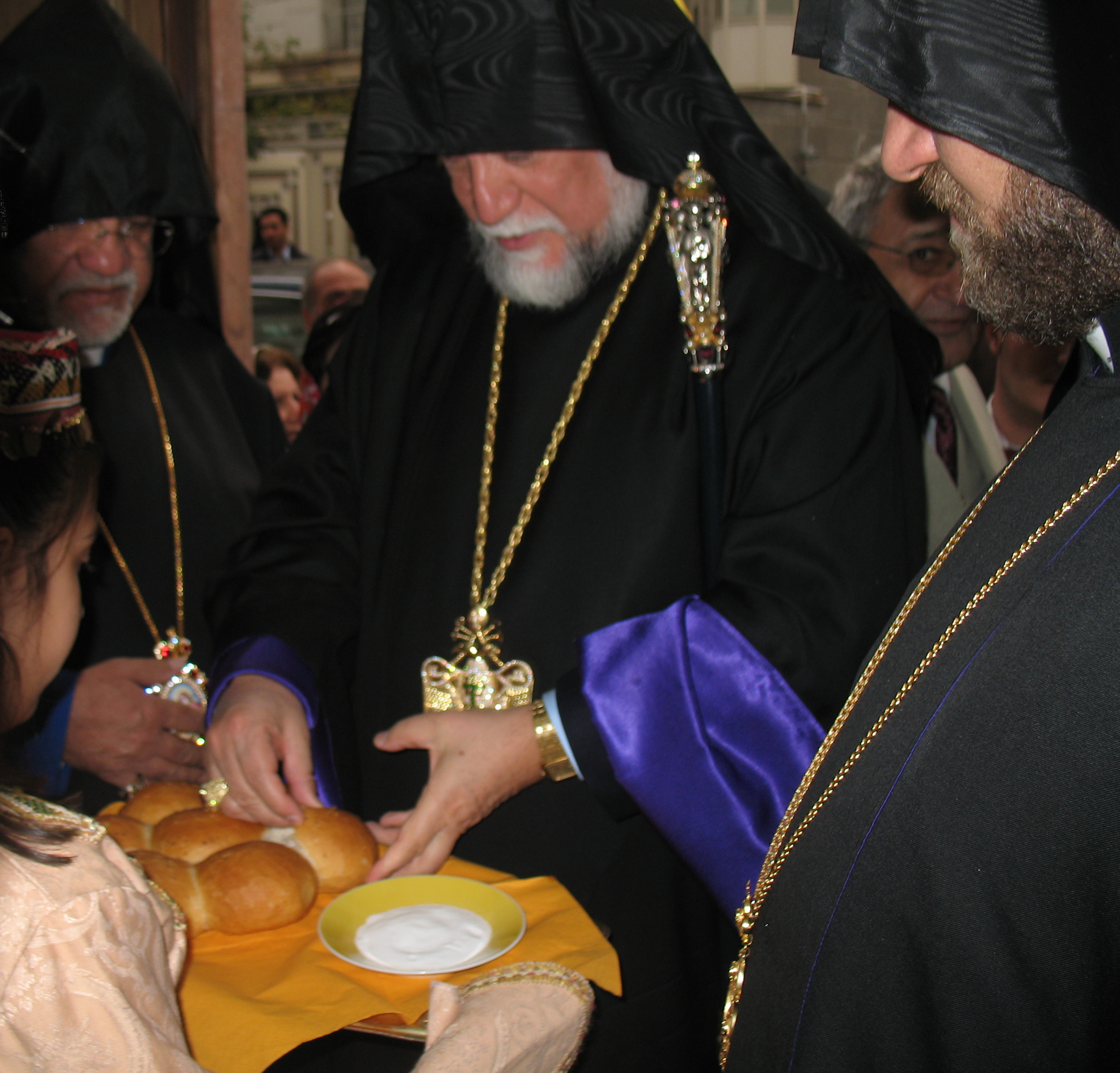
Sepuh Sargsyan (left) and Aram I (center) during his visit at Vartanants Church in Teheran, 2008

The St. Vartanants Church in Tehran had no major individual benefactors; it was established by the people of the community. It was blessed by Aram I, the Catholicos of the Holy See of Cilicia during each of his three visits to Iran in 1996, 2005 and 2008.

The Armenian bishop Artak Manukian who was the prelate of Armenians in Tehran died in 1999; in the same year a new bishop, Sepuh Sargsyan, was appointed for Prelacy of Armenians in Tehran.

After the Iranian Revolution much of Armenian population in Iran emigrated to western countries in general and the United States of America in particular. And Armenian community in Heshmatiye locality also effected by wave of emigration that is taken place for last 30 years. Now few families remain in the St. Vartanants church area.

== See also ==
- Armenians in Iran
- List of Armenian churches in Iran
