= St. Catherine Convent =

Iranian national heritage site

Saint Catherine Convent of New Julfa
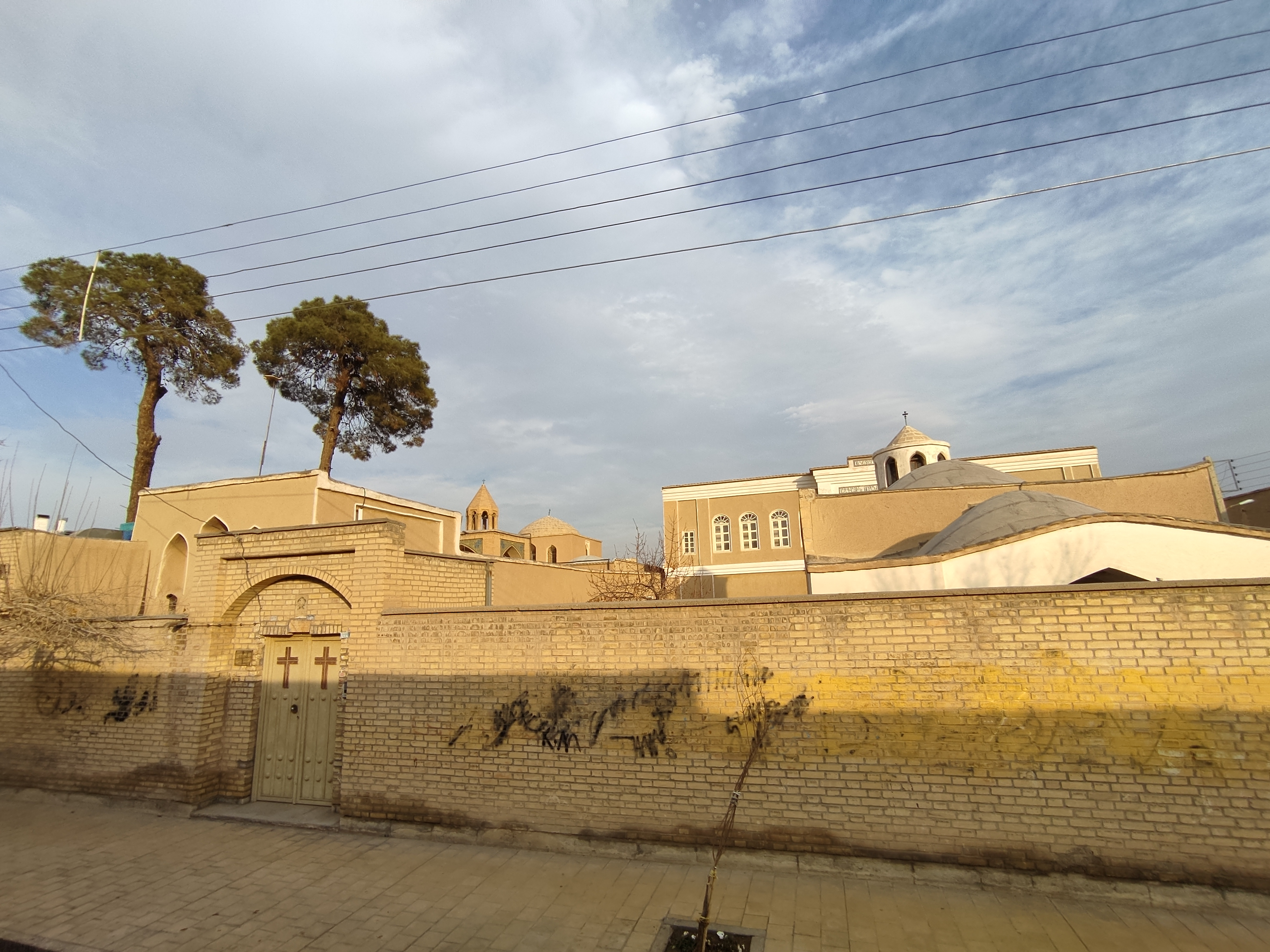

- Location within Iran

Religion
- Affiliation: Armenian Apostolic Church
- Rite: Armenian
- Status: Functioning

Location
- Location: New Julfa, Isfahan, Iran
- Coordinates: 32.63205206°N 51.65092081°E

Architecture
- Style: Isfahani
- Completed: 1623

Saint Catherine Convent of New Julfa, (Armenian: Նոր Ջուղայի Սուրբ Կատարինէ Մմենաստան or Կուսանաց Վանք, Persian: کلیسای کاتارینه مقدس), is an Armenian Apostolic church in New Julfa, Iran. It is located in Charsou neighbourhood of New Julfa, next to St. John the Baptist Church.

== History ==
Saint Catherine Convent was built in 1623 by Khoja Yeghiazar, the ancestor of the famous Lazarian family (ru) and grandfather of Aghazar Lazarian (hy), for his sisters, Catherine and Tajlum. The first female school in New Julfa, Catherine School, was opened there in 1858. In 1900, a separate building was built for the school called "St. Catherine School", which still exists today. Another two-storey building was built on the initiative of Bagrat Vardazarian as an orphanage-workshop, which several of its rooms were used for carpet weaving. In 1964, its rooms were destroyed and John Tunian funded to build an orphanage, which later served as a nursing home. The convent used to be famous for its cold well, which was used by the locals. In the 1970s, the well became unusable due to the widening of the nearby street.

== See also ==
- Iranian Armenians
- List of Armenian churches in Iran
