= St. Mary Church, Isfahan =

17th-century church in Iran

St. Mary Church
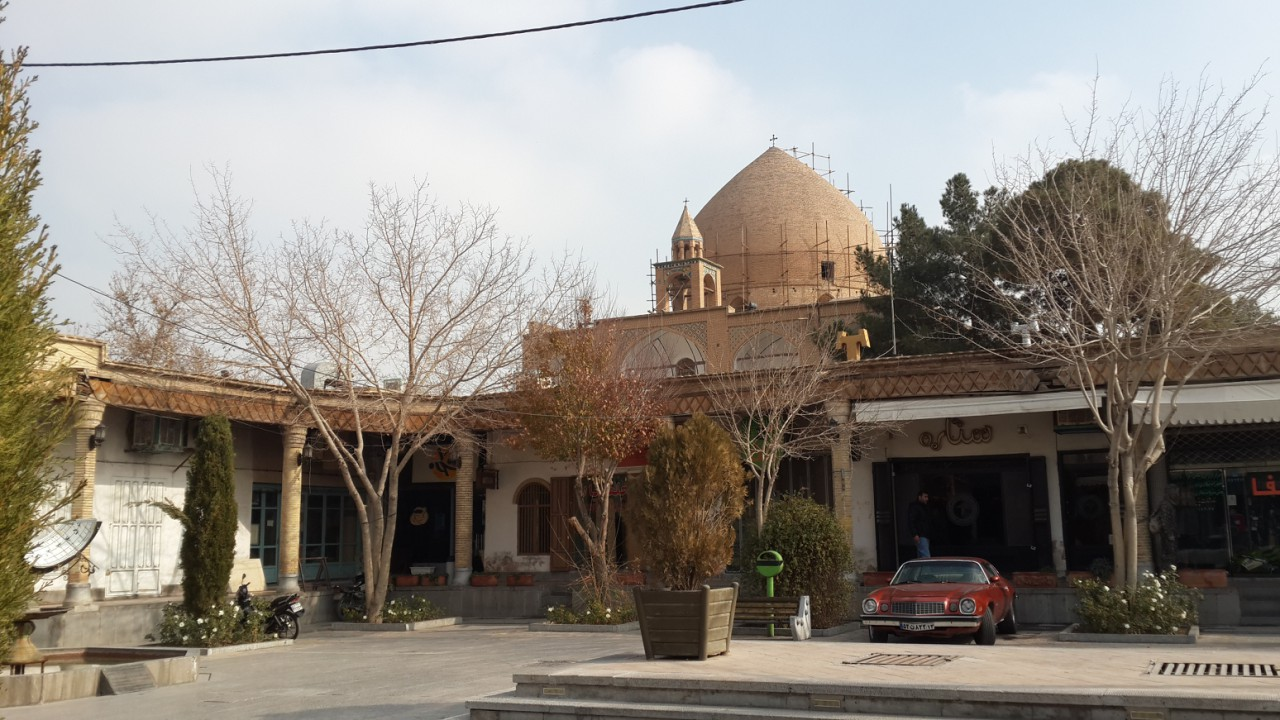

- Location within Iran

Religion
- Affiliation: Armenian Apostolic Church
- Province: Isfahan

Location
- Location: Julfa quarter, Isfahan, Iran
- Municipality: Isfahan
- Coordinates: 32.6358694°N 51.65805548°E

Architecture
- Type: Church
- Style: Isfahani
- Completed: 1613

Saint Mary Church of New Julfa (Armenian: Նոր Ջուղայի Սուրբ Աստվածածին Եկեղեցի, Persian: کلیسای مریم مقدس) is a historical Armenian church in Isfahan, Iran, completed in 1613.

== History ==
In the 17th century the Armenian people of New Julfa built a small church named Surp Hakop Church. Surp Hakop Church is the oldest surviving church of New Julfa. It was built strictly for the religious needs of the people and did not have any kind of decorations. However, as the Armenian population in New Julfa increased, the church became insubstantial. Hence, Khoja Avedik, a wealthy silk merchant, went to the church and decided to expand the church when he could not attend a religious ceremony because the church was full. He decorated the church with lights, silver and gold chandeliers, and valuable canvases and paintings. He rebuilt the entire church using his own personal funds and named it St. Mary church. Khoja Avedik was then buried in the church after his death. Two large paintings painted by European artists have been bought by an Armenian businessman and have been donated to the church.

== Architecture ==
The plan of the east-west rectangular church is of the type of domed halls in Armenian architecture. The building has several small arched domes, but its main dome, which has four skylights; is located in the middle of the building and is fixed on arches that rest on wide columns attached to the north and south walls.

These columns divide the interior of the church into three interconnected sections. In the eastern part of the building is the altar of the church and on both sides there are two rectangular chambers.

The materials used in the building are clay and brick. The interior walls of the building are covered with plaster, and on them are paintings with themes from the Bible. The area around the church, except for its eastern side, has a portico with twenty stone-carved columns. Arches connect all these columns.

The outer surface of the arches is decorated with glazed tiles in different colors, which adds to the beauty of the exterior of the church. There are various buildings in the churchyard. In 1848, the bell tower was built in the western part of the church and above its entrance.. Adjacent to the south side of the building is a small chapel called Stepanos. The Church of the Holy Sepulcher is located near and inside the courtyard of this church.

== Gallery ==
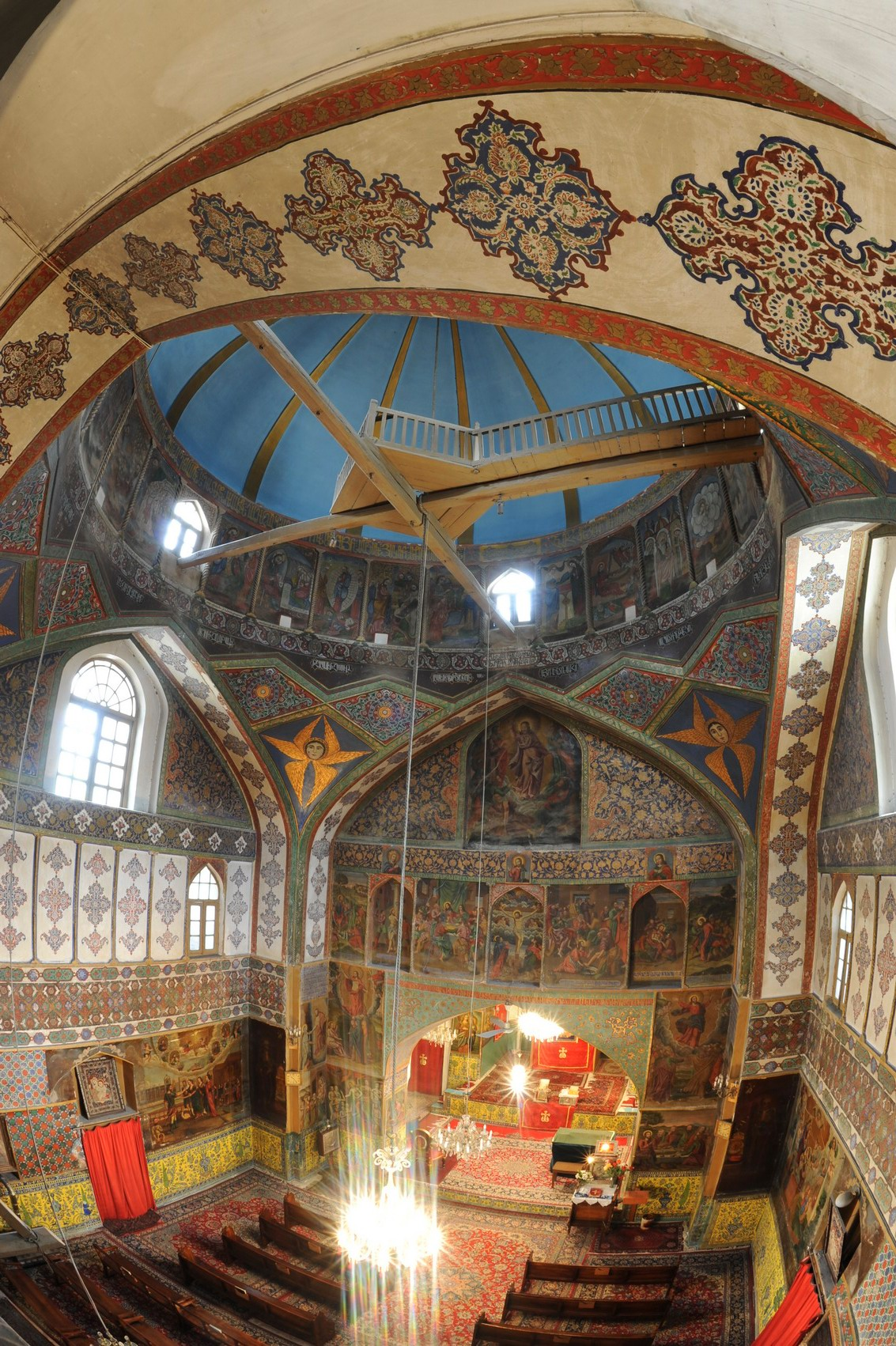
Interior of the church

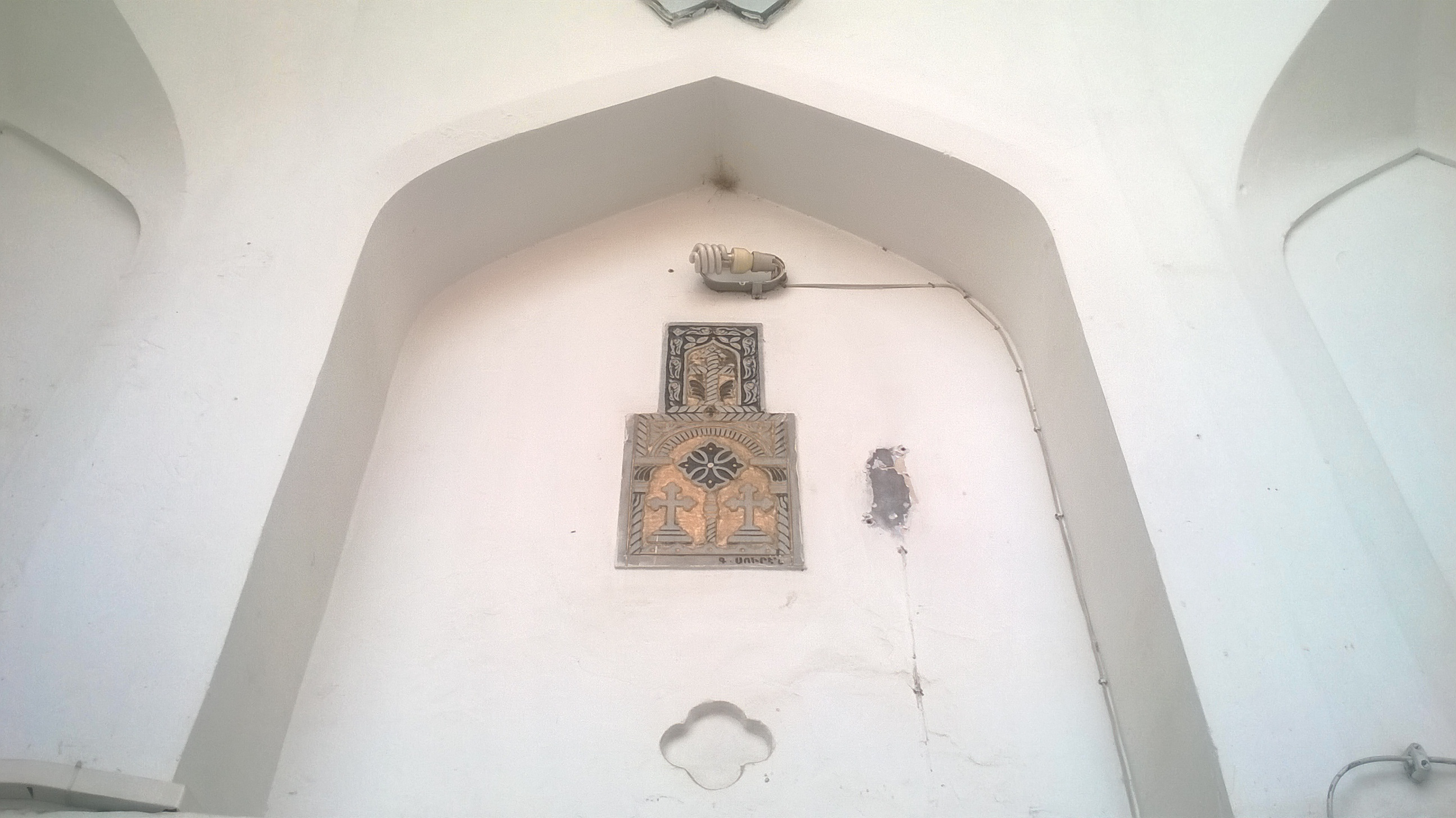
ٍٍ Entrance facade

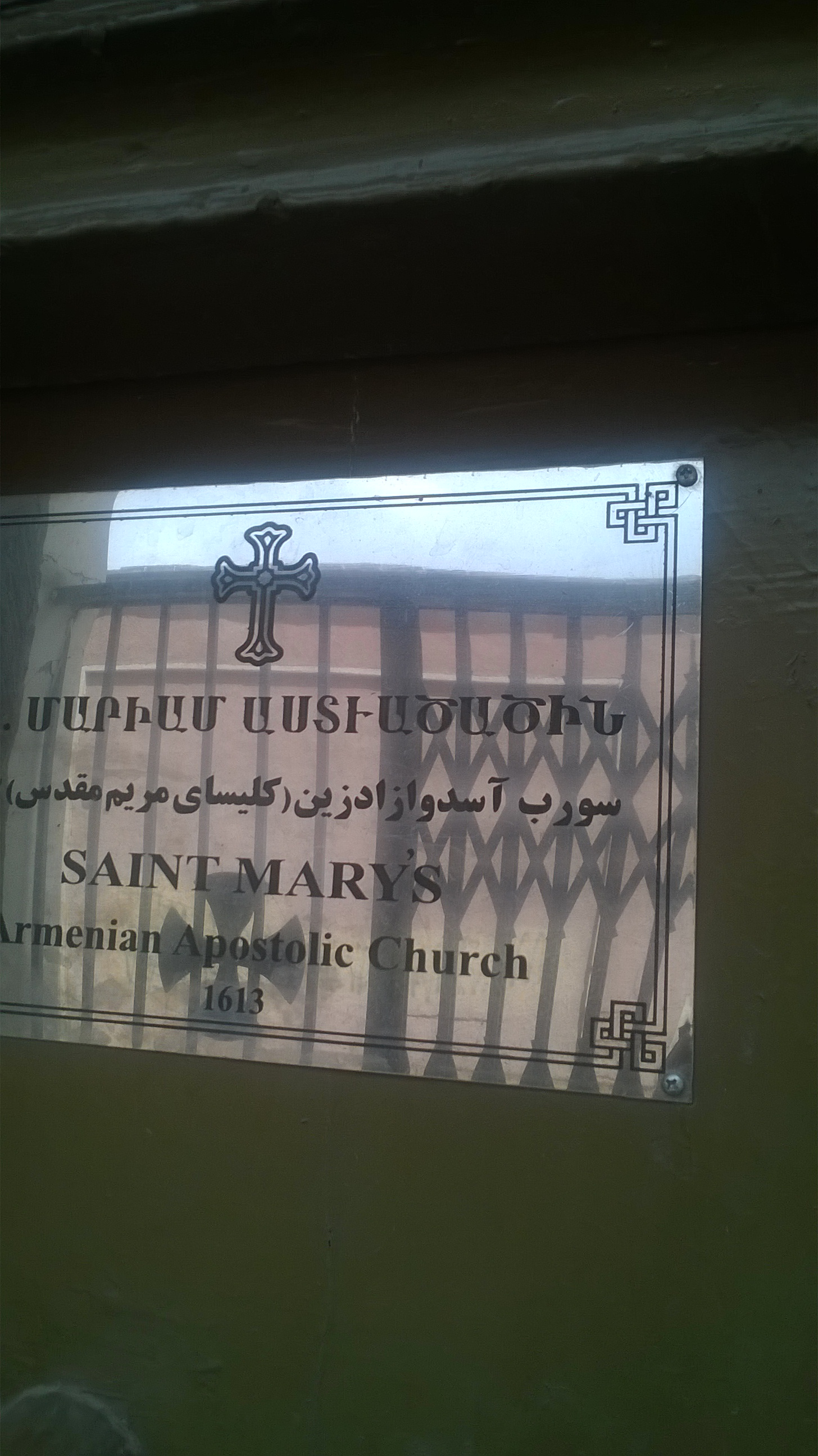
Entrance to the church

== See also ==
Armenian Apostolic Diocese of Isfahan and Southern Iran

List of Armenian churches in Iran

Iran National Heritage List

Ministry of Cultural Heritage, Handicrafts and Tourism
