= Sohrol =

Sohrol سهرل
- Village
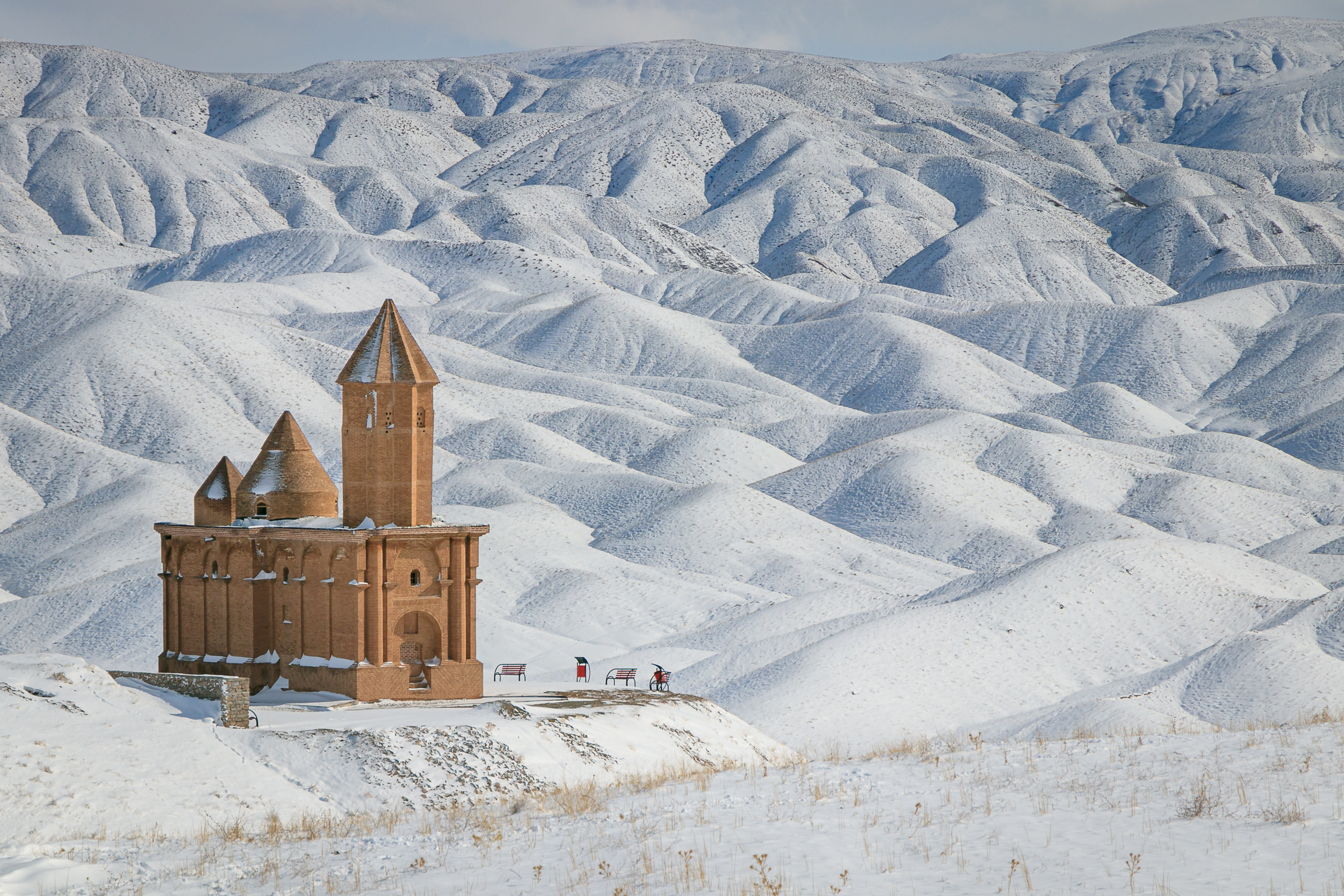
- Saint John Church

- Location within Iran
- Coordinates: 38°18′00″N 46°11′52″E
- Country: Iran
- Province: East Azerbaijan
- County: Shabestar
- Bakhsh: Sufian
- Rural District: Rudqat

Population (2006)
  - Total: 209
- Time zone: UTC+3:30 (IRST)
  - Summer (DST): UTC+4:30 (IRDT)

Sohrol (Persian: سهرل, also Romanized as Sahrol; also known as Sohreqeh, Sokhrul, and Sūhrul; in Armenian: Սոհրոլ) is a village in Rudqat Rural District, Sufian District, Shabestar County, East Azerbaijan Province, Iran. At the 2006 census, its population was 209, in 55 families.
