= Bogatyr battalion =

19th-century Iranian battalion of deserters from the Russian army

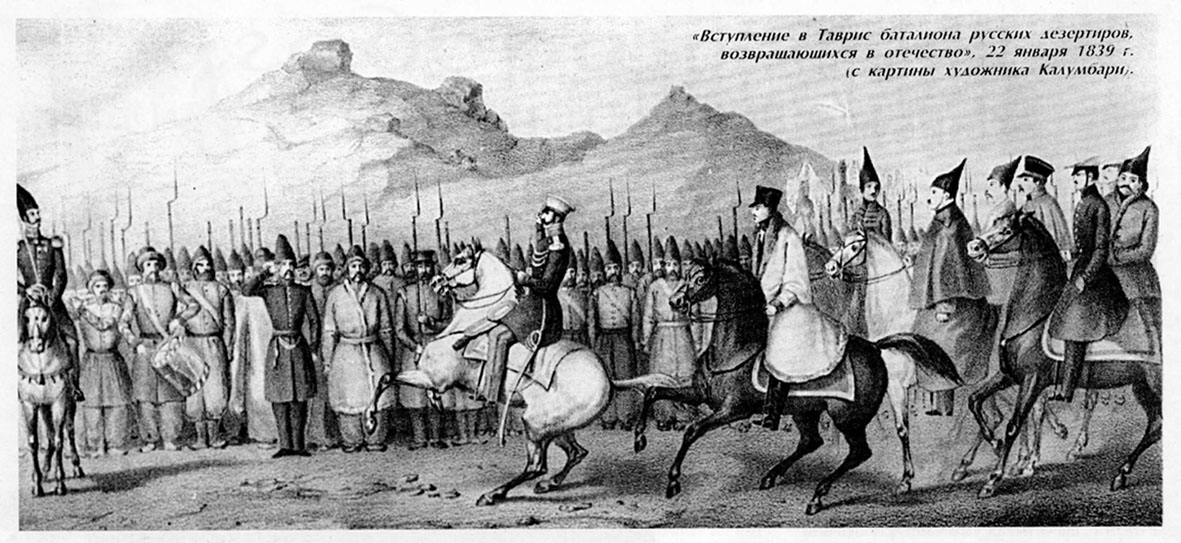
"Entry into Tabriz of the battalion of Russian deserters returning to the fatherland, January 22, 1838." Painted by F. Colombari.

The Bogatyr battalion (Russian: Батальон богатырей; Persian: گردان بهادران Gordān e Bahādorān) was a battalion made up of deserters from the Russian army formed in 19th-century Iran, primarily during and for a time after the era of the Russo-Iranian Wars.

== Notable Commanders ==
- Abbas Mirza
- Mohammad Shah Qajar
- Samson Makintsev
- Yevstafii Skryplev

== Sources ==
- Cronin, Stephanie. "ARMY iv a. Qajar Period". Encyclopaedia Iranica.
- Батальон богатырей // Б (Blanc) порох — Бомба. — СПб.; [М.] : Тип. т-ва Ivan Sytin, 1911. — С. 412. — (Военная энциклопедия : [в 18 т.] / Под ред. В. Ф. Новицкого [и др.]; т. 4).
- Cronin, Stephanie, ed. (2013). Iranian-Russian Encounters: Empires and Revolutions Since 1800. Routledge. pp. 149–150. ISBN 978-0415624336.
- Kibovskii, Aleksandr. BAGADERAN" - RUSSIAN DESERTERS IN THE PERSIAN ARMY, 1802-1839. (From Tseikhgauz, No. 5, 1996.)
