= Haftevan =

Village in West Azerbaijan province, Iran

Haftevan Persian: هفتوان
- Village
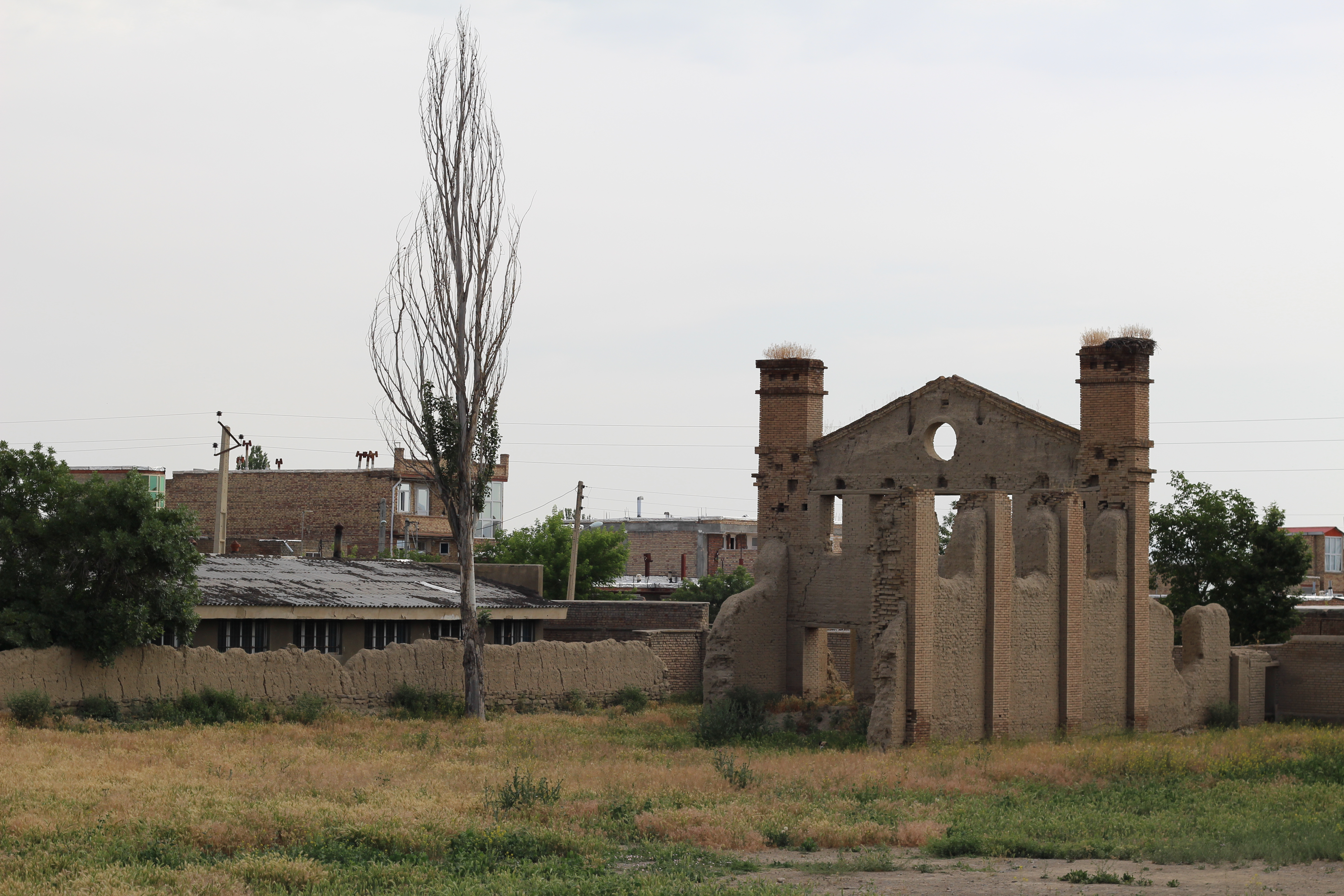
- St. George Church, a 13th century Armenian church

- Location within Iran
- Coordinates: 38°10′03″N 44°45′19″E
- Country: Iran
- Province: West Azerbaijan
- County: Salmas
- District: Central
- Rural District: Zulachay

Population (2016)
  - Total: 8,203
- Time zone: UTC+3:30 (IRST)

Haftevan (Persian: هفتوان) (Note: Armenian: Հաւթւան or Հաֆթվան) is a village in Zulachay Rural District of the Central District in Salmas County, West Azerbaijan province, Iran.

== Haftevan massacre ==
In early 1915, the village was occupied by the Ottoman Army, whose commander required local Christians to register for food rations. Instead, 700 Christians were executed in the village on the orders of Djevdet Bey. Kurdish tribesmen under the command of Simko Shikak also took part in this massacre. Russian Army commander K. Matikyan reported seeing "with my own eyes hundreds of mangled corpses in pits, stinking from infection, lying in the open. I saw headless corpses, chopped off by axes, hands, legs, piles of heads, corpses crushed under rocks from fallen walls". According to historian David Gaunt, "This was where the Ottoman soldiers learned to execute unarmed noncombatant Christians", leading to the Armenian genocide and Assyrian genocide.

== Demographics ==
=== Ethnicity ===
In 1930, the village was populated by Armenians, Azerbaijanis and Kurds.

=== Population ===
At the time of the 2006 National Census, the village's population was 6,313 in 1,216 households. The following census in 2011 counted 7,995 people in 1,796 households. The 2016 census measured the population of the village as 8,203 people in 1,935 households. It was the most populous village in its rural district.
