= Mujumbar =

Mujumbar موجومبار
- Village
- Location within Iran
- Coordinates: 38°22′16″N 46°13′56″E
- Country: Iran
- Province: East Azerbaijan
- County: Shabestar
- Bakhsh: Sufian
- Rural District: Rudqat

Population (2006)
  - Total: 391
- Time zone: UTC+3:30 (IRST)
  - Summer (DST): UTC+4:30 (IRDT)

Mujumbar (Persian: موجومبار, also Romanized as Mūjūmbār; also known as Moo Jambar, Mūjombār, Mūjonbār, Mushembar, and Mu yi Shimr; in Armenian: Մուժումբար) is an Armenian village in Rudqat Rural District, Sufian District, Shabestar County, East Azerbaijan Province, Iran. At the 2006 census, its population was 391, in 92 families.
