= St. Minas Church =

Iranian national heritage site

Saint Minas Church of New Julfa
- Location within Iran

Religion
- Affiliation: Armenian Apostolic Church
- Rite: Armenian
- Status: Functioning

Location
- Location: New Julfa, Isfahan, Iran
- Coordinates: 32.63090006°N 51.64642543°E

Architecture
- Style: Isfahani
- Completed: 1659

Saint Minas Church of New Julfa, (Armenian: Նոր Ջուղայի Սուրբ Մինաս Եկեղեցի, Persian: کلیسای میناس مقدس), is an Armenian Apostolic church in New Julfa, Iran. It is located in Davrezh neighbourhood of New Julfa.

== History ==
Saint Minas Church was built in 1659, 4 years after relocation of Tabriz Armenians from Shamsabad, another neighbourhood of Isfahan. They had built a St. Mary Church there and after relocating to New Julfa, the built this church named originally St. Mary. After devotion of relic of St. Minas to this church, it was renamed to St. Minas Church. There are some tombstones in the courtyard, two Georgians and a deputy British consul in Isfahan. A chapel was built in the church in 1713. The church was renovated in 1909.

== See also ==
- Iranian Armenians
- List of Armenian churches in Iran
