= Krysle Lip =

American record producer, songwriter, and artist

- Born: United States
- Occupations: Record producer; songwriter; visual artist
- Years active: 2010s–present

Krysle Lip is an American record producer, songwriter, and visual artist.

In 2018, Lip was in charge of the transformation of the Hall of Mirrors, creating a permanent exhibition in the historical room inside Grevin Paris.
