= Mohammad Reza Beg =

Safavid mayor and ambassador to France (d. 1717)

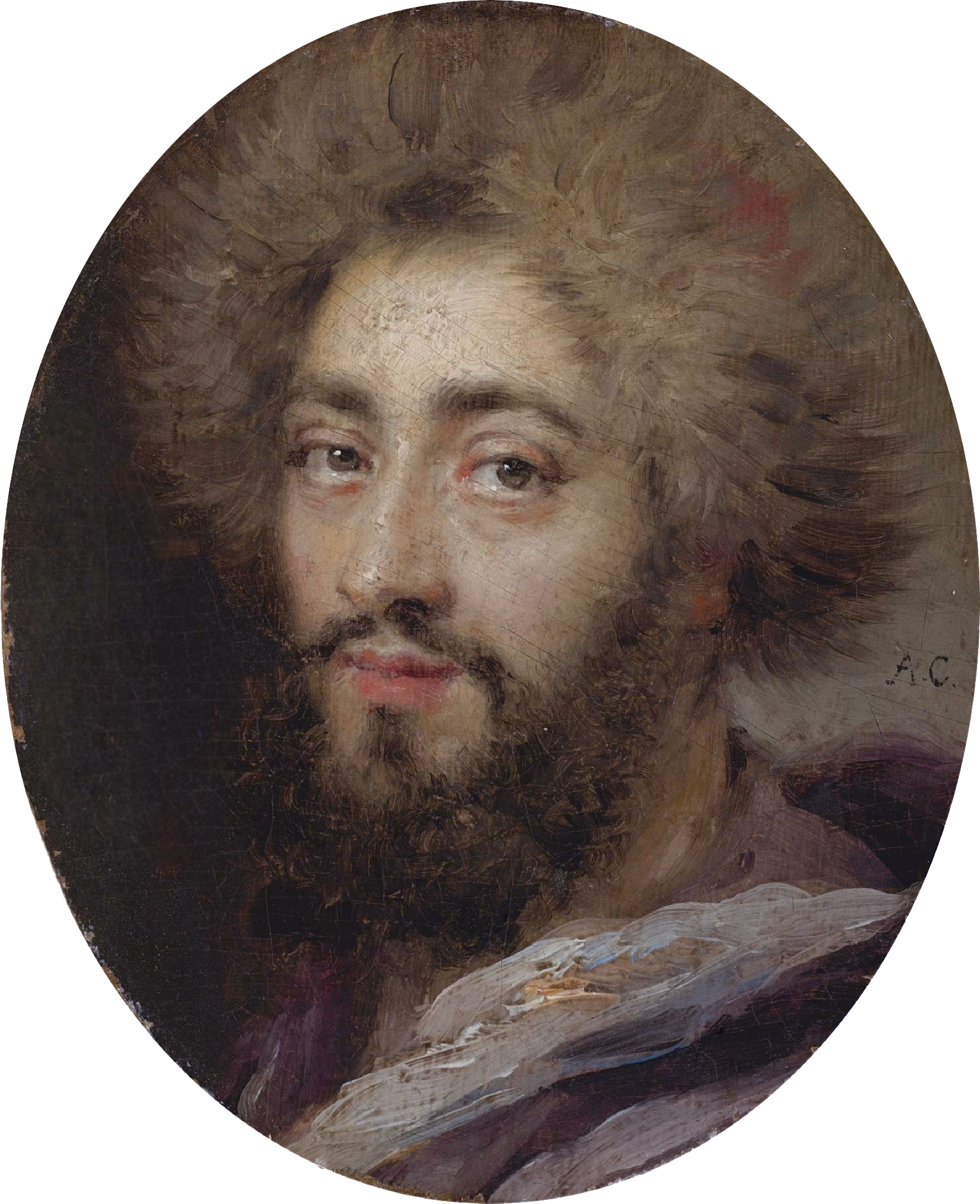
- Mohammad Reza Beg as painted by Antoine Coypel

Safavid mayor of Erivan
- Monarch: Soltan Hoseyn

Safavid ambassador to France
- Monarch: Soltan Hoseyn

Personal details
- Died: 1717
- Occupation: Governor, Diplomat

Mohammad Reza Beg (Persian: محمدرضا بیگ, romanized: Mohammad-Rezâ Beg; in French-language sources: Méhémet Riza Beg), was the Safavid mayor (kalantar) of Erivan (Iravan), and the ambassador to France during the reign of Soltan Hoseyn (1694–1722). He led the embassy to Louis XIV of 1715.

== Biography ==
Mohammad Reza Beg was the mayor of Erivan and a high-ranking official to the governor of the Erivan province, when, upon the governments initiative, he was sent in embassy to France, in March 1714. He had to cross Constantinople in the neighboring Ottoman Empire, in the guise of a pilgrim, as the former was often at war with Safavid Iran, and relations were unstable. Being still imprisoned, he was released thanks to the French ambassador in Constantinople, Pierre des Alleurs and his "astute dragoman" Etienne Padery, before being conveyed to Marseille (which he reached on 23 October 1714) and Versailles, where he was lavishly received and with great pomp. On 13 August 1715, he reached a new Treaty with the Louis XIV's government, which, included a more favourable provision regarding the French trade. As another result of the diplomatic mission, a permanent Persian consulate was established in Marseille, the main French Mediterranean port for the trade with the East, soon staffed by Hagopdjan de Deritchan.

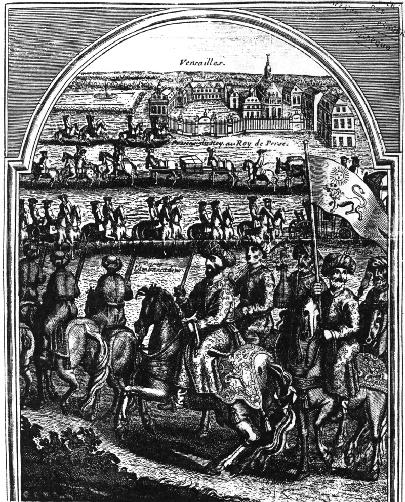
Entry of Mohammad Reza Beg in Versailles

On 19 February 1715, at 11 AM, Mohammad Reza Beg made his entry into the Château de Versailles on horseback with his large retinue, accompanied by the presenter of ambassadors and the lieutenant of the king’s armies. Crowds reportedly filled the avenue de Paris and the courtyards to attend the arrival of the ambassador and his retinue. The courtiers crowded into the Hall of Mirrors, where four tiers of seats had been set up for them. The Hall of Mirrors was packed, with many foreigners present. At the back, Louis XIV on his throne was surrounded by the future Louis XV and his governess, Madame de Ventadour, the Duc d’Orléans Philippe II, and other royal princes. The painter Antoine Coypel and Boze, Secretary of the Academy of Inscriptions, stood below the platform to record the event.

Mohammad Reza Beg entered the Hall of Mirrors, accompanied by an interpreter. Reportedly pretending to understand French, he said he was unhappy with the translation. After a long audience, he attended the dinner given in his honour. He left Versailles after visiting the young Louis XV, whom he reportedly liked He was received for the last time by the king during his reign on 13 August.

On 12 September 1715, he embarked at Le Havre and returned to Persia via Muscovy. He reached Erivan in May 1717, after a journey of some twenty-one months. But the political climate had changed and Reza Beg had lost the gifts meant for his master. In despair, he poisoned himself.

== Influences in literature ==
During the time he spent in Paris, however, feverish speculation ran rife about this exotic personage, his unpaid bills, his lavish but exotic lifestyle, the possibilities of amours, all concentrated in a pot-boiler romance of the beautiful but repeatedly kidnapped Georgian, Amanzolide, by M. d'Hostelfort, Amanzolide, nouvelle historique et galante, qui contient les aventures secrètes de Mehemed-Riza-Beg, ambassadeur du Sophi de Perse à la cour de Louis le Grand en 1715. (Paris: P. Huet, 1716). It was quickly translated into English, as Amanzolide, story of the life, the amours and the secret adventures of Mehemed-Riza-Beg, Persian ambassador to the court of Louis the Great in 1715 a true turquerie, or fanciful Eastern imagining, which did not discriminate too finely between Ottoman Turkey and Safavid Persia.

More permanent literary results were embodied in Montesquieu's Lettres Persanes (1725), in which a satiric critique of French society was placed in the pen of an imagined Persian homme de bonne volonté, a "man of good will".

The Memoirs of Saint-Simon for the year record contemporary court gossip that the ambassador was in fact an ordinary merchant from Persian lands, perhaps sent by "the governor of his province with business to transact in France" and put up as an ambassador by Pontchartrain, minister for trade and much else, essentially in a successful attempt to cheer up the aged king. He says of the ambassador "there seemed to be nothing genuine about him, and his behaviour was as disgraceful as his wretched suite and miserable presents. Moreover he produced neither credentials nor instructions from the King of Persia or his ministers".

== Sources ==
- Calmard, Jean (2000). "France ii. Relations With Persia to 1789". Encyclopaedia Iranica, Vol. X, Fasc. 2. pp. 127–131.
- Chardonnet, Sylvain (March 2025). "Le passage de Mehmet Reza beg, kalantar d'Erevan et ambassadeur de Perse, à Moulins et en Bourbonnais (janvier 1715)". Études Bourbonnaises (in French). 381. Moulins: Société bourbonnaise des études locales: 161–185. ISSN 0980-7225.
- Ebrahimnejad, Hormoz (2013). Medicine in Iran: Profession, Practice and Politics, 1800-1925. Palgrave Macmillan. ISBN 978-1137052889.
- Floor, Willem; Herzig, Edmund, eds. (2015). Iran and the World in the Safavid Age. I.B.Tauris. ISBN 978-1780769905.
- Mokhberi, Susan (2012). "Finding Common Ground Between Europe and Asia: Understanding and Conflict During the Persian Embassy to France in 1715". Journal of Early Modern History. 16. Los Angeles: Brill: 53–80. doi:10.1163/157006512X624100.
- Montesquieu (2014). Persian Letters: With Related Texts. Translated, with Introduction and Notes, by Raymond N. MacKenzie. Hackett Publishing. ISBN 978-1624661822.
