= Hall of Mirrors =

Grand central gallery in the Palace of Versailles

Coordinates: 48°48′17.4″N 2°7′13.2″E

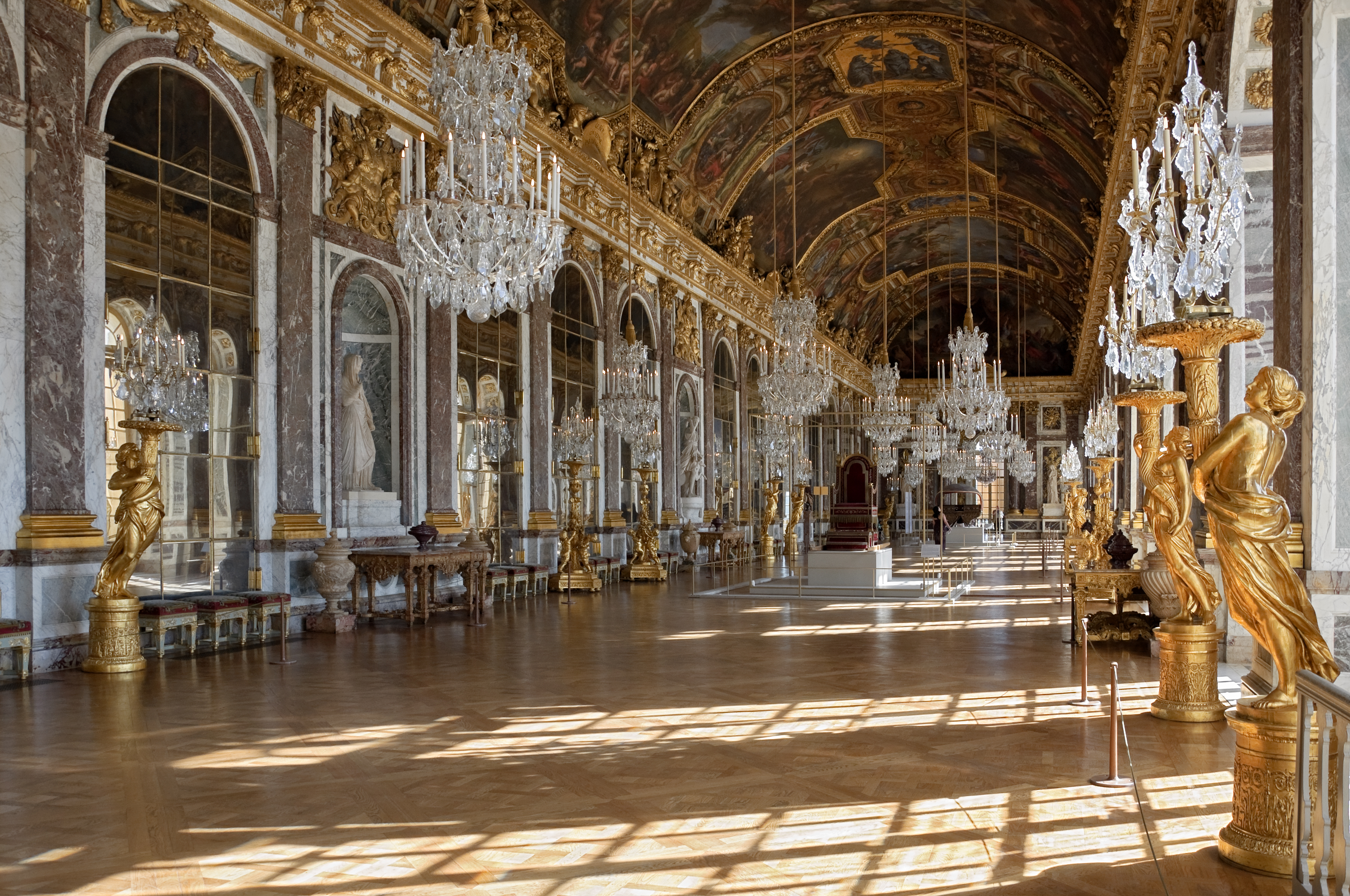
Hall of Mirrors, Palace of Versailles.

The Hall of Mirrors (French: Grande Galerie, Galerie des Glaces, Galerie de Louis XIV) is a grand Baroque style gallery and one of the most emblematic rooms in the royal Palace of Versailles near Paris, France. The grandiose ensemble of the hall and its adjoining salons was intended to illustrate the power of the absolutist monarch Louis XIV. Located on the first floor (piano nobile) of the palace's central body, it faces west towards the palace gardens. The Hall of Mirrors has been the scene of events of great historic significance, including the Proclamation of the German Empire and the signing of the Treaty of Versailles.

== Cultural and historical background ==
=== Construction ===
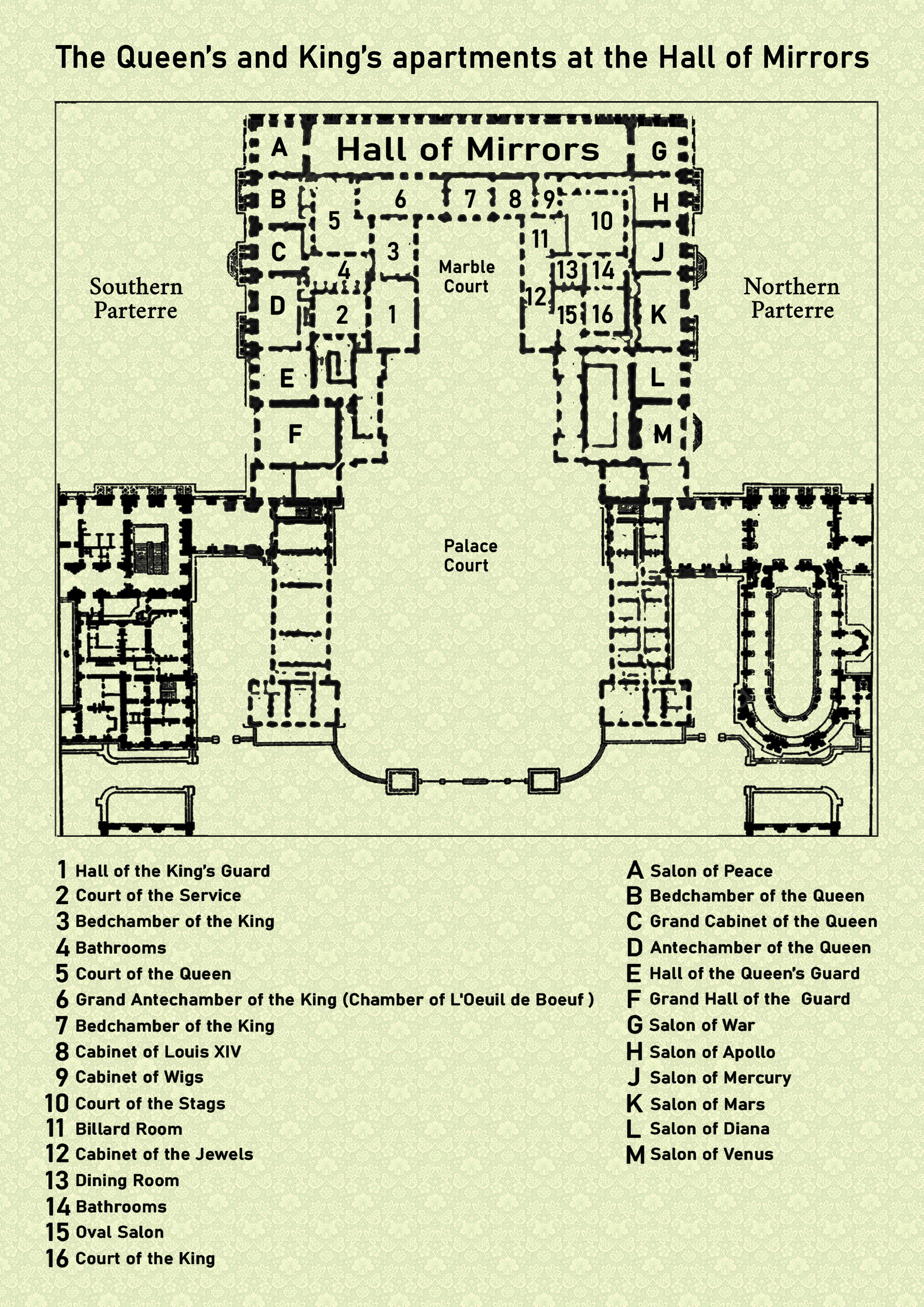
The royal apartments adjacent to the Hall of Mirrors

In 1623, King Louis XIII ordered the construction of a modest two-story hunting lodge at Versailles, which he enlarged to a château from 1631 to 1634. His son Louis XIV declared the site his future permanent residence in 1661 and ordered the transformation into an extensive residence in several stages and on a grandiose scale. The palace was to provide ideal settings for rest and retreat but it also had to attain a new quality of representation as the future seat of Europe's greatest absolutist royal court and government of supreme authority, residence of choice for the aristocratic society and arena for elaborate state festivals and ceremonies, Europe's centre of culture, art and entertainment.

During the early expansion phase, Louis Le Vau added the Forecourt (1662) and the "Le Vau Envelope" (1668 to 1670), encased the old château and added two new wings in the north and south. The new wings towered over the original western building by the garden. The space in between was a terrace supported by arcades. The buildings of the "Le Vau Envelope" included the king's apartments in the north and the queen's apartments in the south.

The Hall of Mirrors was built during the third building stage between 1678 and 1684 and replaced a large terrace and several smaller salons facing the gardens. The terrace was originally situated directly outside of the King's and the Queen's apartments. The terrace was considered to be a rather misplaced architectural element and exposed to the elements, reducing its utility. Eventually it was decided to demolish it. Architect Jules Hardouin-Mansart was tasked with the design development and the construction of the Mirror Hall Gallery. Artist Charles Le Brun received the honor to create the interior decorative apparatus.

The garden façade of the Corps de logis was built in a straight front and essentially received its current appearance. The Hall of Mirrors is flanked at the far ends by the Salon of War (Salon de la guerre) in the north and the Salon of Peace (Salon de la paix) in the south, respectively. The Hall of Mirrors connects to the two salons, which were assigned to and incorporated into the king's apartments in the north and the queen's apartments in the south.

Both salons are accessible via the Hall of Mirrors through wide opening passageways. The hall and the two salons were identically furnished and decorated and form a stylistic and functional unit. The exterior walls of the salons date from the time of Le Vau's encasings of the old château and were given their current appearance after the installation of the Hall of Mirrors by Hardouin-Mansart.

The Hall of Mirrors is—besides the Palace Chapel, completed in the early 18th century, the Court Opera and the Galerie des Batailles—one of the largest rooms in the palace. It is 73 m (240 ft) long and 10.50 m (34.4 ft) deep. With its height of 12.30 m (40.4 ft) it reaches to the Attic floor of the Corps de Logis. The square windows on the upper floor, which can be seen from the outside, only serve aesthetic purposes, as there are no rooms inside. The installation of any kind of fireplaces was never contemplated as the Hall of Mirrors was too large to effectively be heated.

== Arts and decoration ==
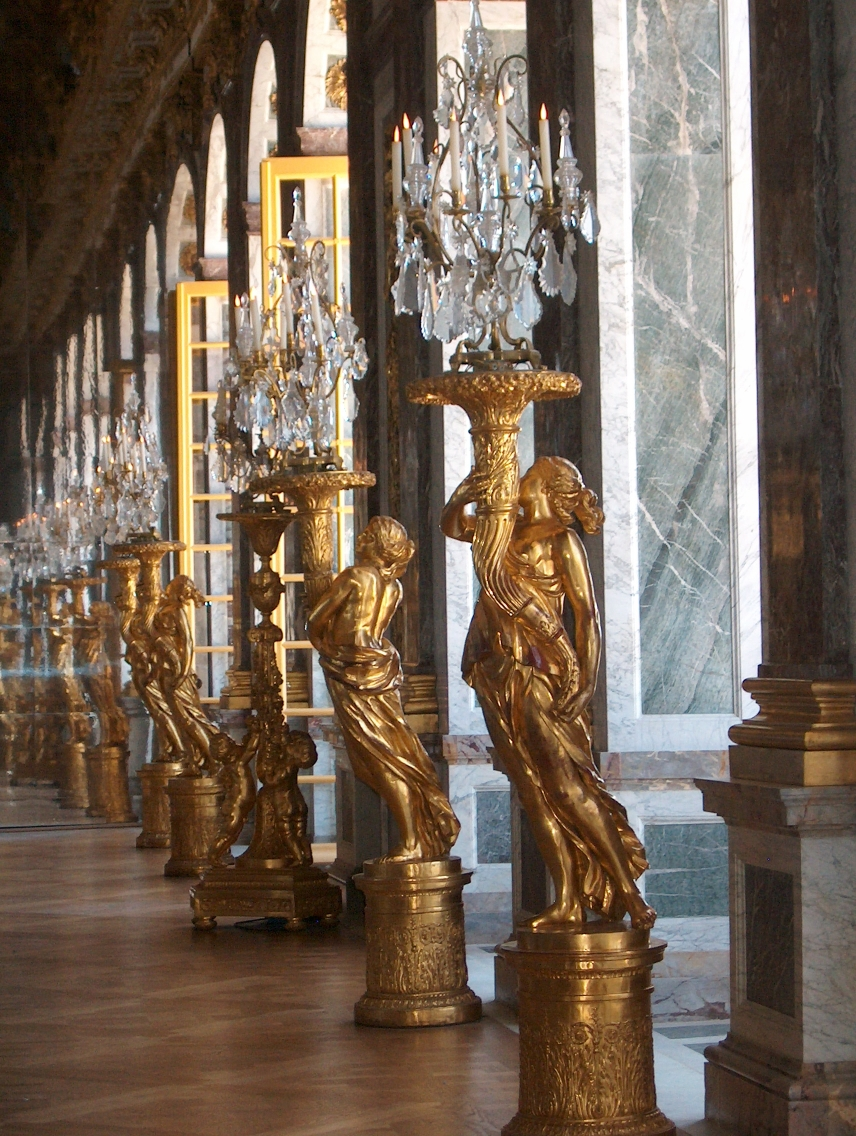
Sculptured torchères replaced the 1689 melted down silver guéridons.

The Hall of Mirrors' 17 windows open in the direction of the park. On the opposite inside wall of the hall are 17 equally large mirrors, that are composed of more than 350 individual mirror surfaces. The mirrors had an aesthetic function, as the mirror image of the garden depicted the exterior of the castle into the interior of the building and reflected the candlelight in the evening. The mirrors also conveyed the king's wealth and the efficiency of the French economy in a subtle way.

Mirror glass was an expensive luxury product in the 17th century and could only be produced with great effort. The manufacture of the mirror surfaces was the first major order for the Manufacture royale de glaces de miroirs, a glass factory founded by Jean-Baptiste Colbert, the later Compagnie de Saint-Gobain, with which the Venetian monopoly on the manufacture of mirrors in Europe was broken.

Much of the original solid silver furniture of the Hall of Mirrors, famous at the time, was soon lost, particularly the silver Guéridons (tables), which were melted down and coined by order of Louis XIV in 1689 to finance the War of the League of Augsburg. Today's furniture was manufactured in the 19th century after most of the original furnishings were lost during the French Revolution.

=== Sculptures ===
The gilded bronze capitals of the Rouge de Rance marble pilasters are decorated with the Fleur-de-lis and Gallic roosters. The gilded bronze trophies, that adorn the green marble Pier glasses, were manufactured by goldsmith Pierre Ladoyreau.

The marble and porphyry busts of eight Roman emperors are accompanied by sculptures of Greek and Roman deities and Muses, such as Bacchus, Venus (Venus of Arles), Modesty, Hermes, Urania, Nemesis and Diana (Diana of Versailles). The latter, moved to the Louvre in 1798, was replaced by a Diana sculpted by René Frémin for the gardens of the Château de Marly until the restoration of the Hall of Mirrors during 2004 to 2007, which in turn was replaced by a copy of the original Diana.

=== Ceiling ===
The ceiling combines with the mirrors and the light from the western windows to confer on the room its unique character. Nine large and numerous smaller paintings, most of them on canvas using marouflage and the rest directly painted on masonry, are dedicated to the idolization Louis XIV as the Sun King and to the successes of the first two decades of his personal rule (starting in 1661). Charles Le Brun, "the greatest French artist of all time" according to King Louis XIV, directed the ceiling paintings.

The central scene is titled The King rules by Himself, highlighting Louis's claim to absolute power and his adversarial stance to rival European powers, the main three of which (the Holy Roman Empire, the United Provinces, and Spain) are depicted on the opposite side of the same panel. The themes of the larger panels center on the Franco-Dutch War of 1672–1678, while the other scenes include episodes of the prior War of Devolution of 1667–1668 and domestic achievements.

According to a contemporary anecdote, the decoration of the eastern wall with mirrors was a ploy by architect Jules Hardouin-Mansart to prevent Le Brun from having even more opportunities to impress Louis with his work.

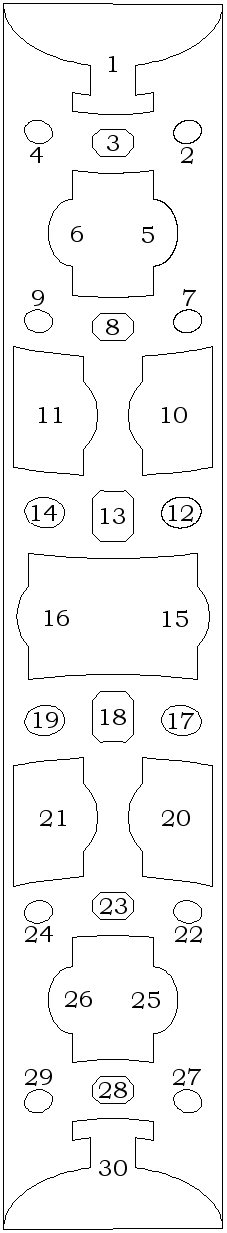
The position of artworks on the ceiling

The narrative sequence of the central scenes starts with the formation of the German (Imperial)-Spanish-Dutch alliance in 1672 on the Northern end, and ends with the unraveling of that alliance with the Dutch acceptance of a separate peace with France in 1678. The full list is a compendium of key propaganda themes of the early 1680s, with titles provided by poets Boileau and Racine in their capacity as the regime's official historians.

==== The paintings of the ceiling by numbers and titles ====
1. Alliance of Germany and Spain with Holland, 1672
2. Holland rescued from the bishop of Munster, 1665
3. Relief of the people during the famine, 1662
4. Reparation of the Corsican Guard's affront in Rome, 1664
5. The crossing of the Rhine in front of the enemy, 1672
6. The King seizes Maastricht in thirteen days, 1673
7. Defeat of the Turks in Hungary by the King's troops, 1664
8. The folly of duelling abolished, 1662
9. The precedence of France acknowledged by Spain, 1662
10. The King gives his orders to simultaneously attack four of Holland's best-defended strongholds, 1672
11. The King ramps up military preparations on land and sea, 1672
12. The restoration of France's naval power, 1663
13. War against Spain for the Queen's rights, 1667
14. The reformation of the justice system, 1667
15. The King rules by Himself, 1661
16. The pomp of France's neighboring powers
17. Order restored to the kingdom's finances, 1662
18. The peace concluded in Aix-la-Chapelle, 1668
19. Protection awarded to the fine arts, 1663
20. Franche-Comté conquered once again, 1674
21. Resolution to undertake war against Holland, 1671
22. Establishment of the royal institution of Les Invalides, 1674
23. Acquisition of Dunkirk, 1662
24. Embassies sent from the confines of the Earth
25. Takeover of the city and citadel of Ghent in six days, 1678
26. Spanish actions countered by the takeover of Ghent
27. Renewal of the alliance with the Swiss, 1663
28. Safety of the City of Paris, 1665
29. The junction of the two seas, 1667
30. Holland accepts peace and leaves the alliance with Germany and Spain, 1678

Many of the same themes would be illustrated again a few years later, albeit with a different iconography, in the Louis XIV Victory Monument on Place des Victoires in the center of Paris.

==== Picture gallery of selected ceiling paintings ====
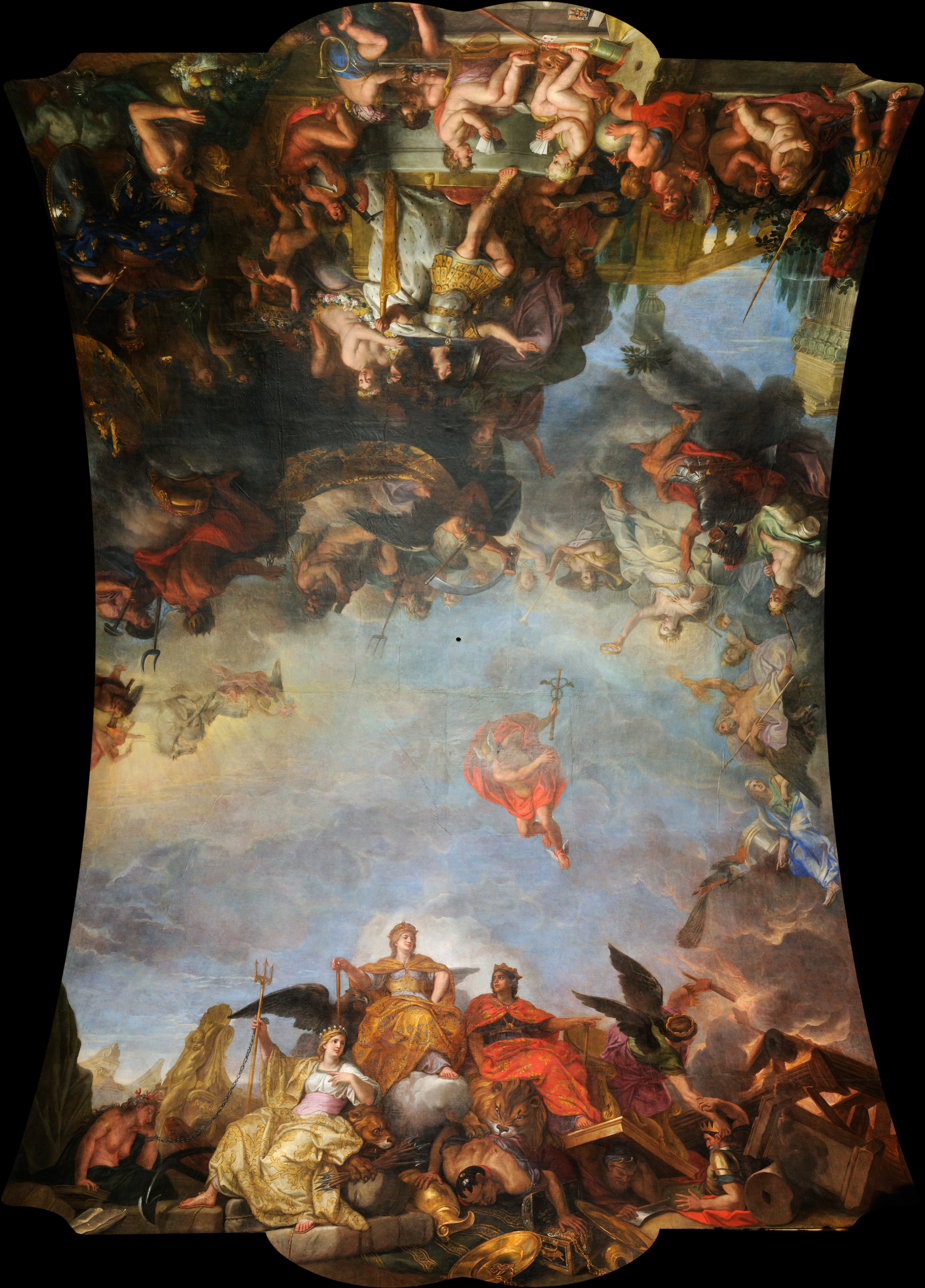
The King rules by Himself, 1661 (top) and The pomp of France's neighboring powers (bottom)

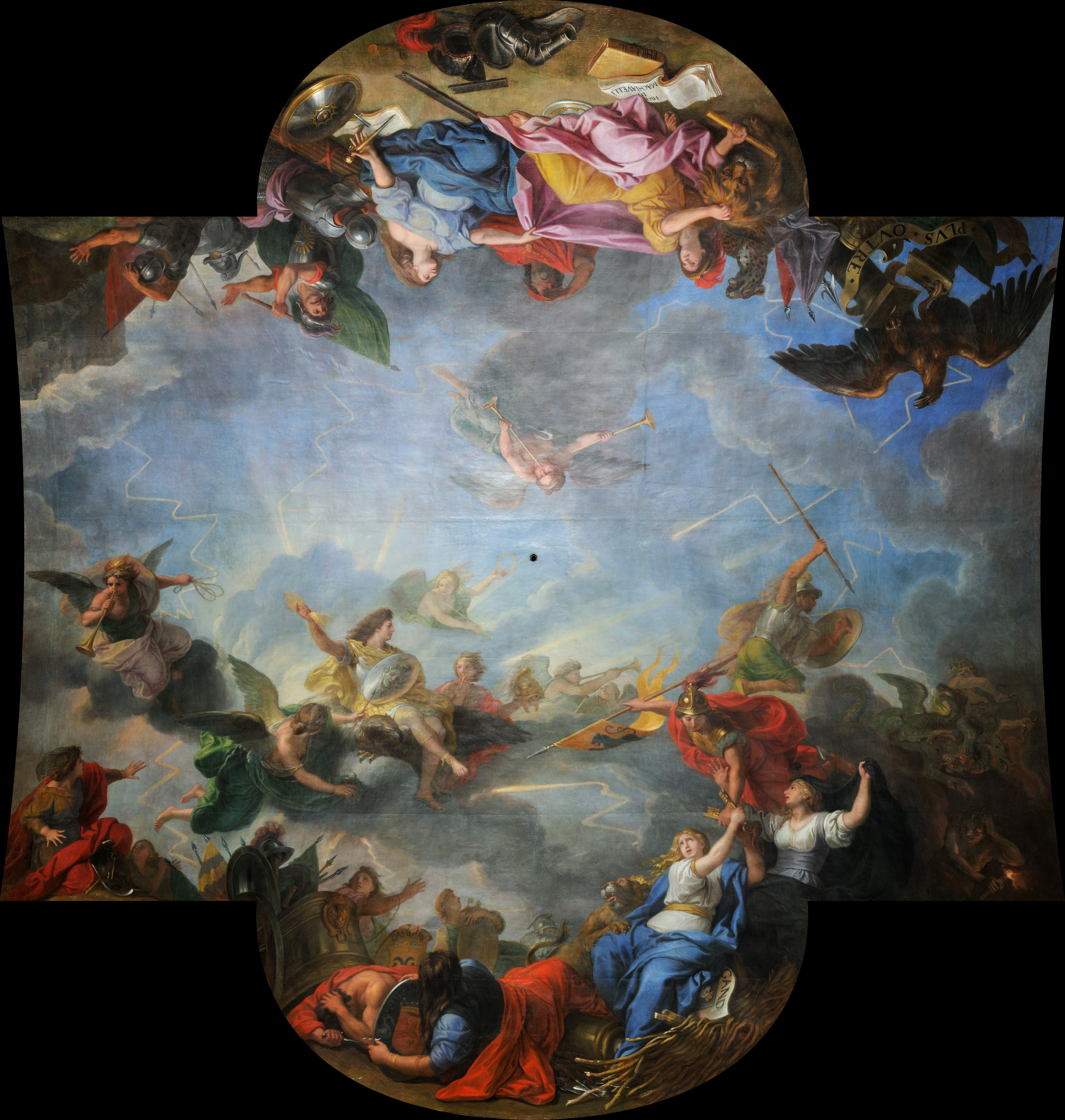
Takeover of the city and citadel of Gand in six days, 1678 and Spanish actions countered by the takeover of Ghent

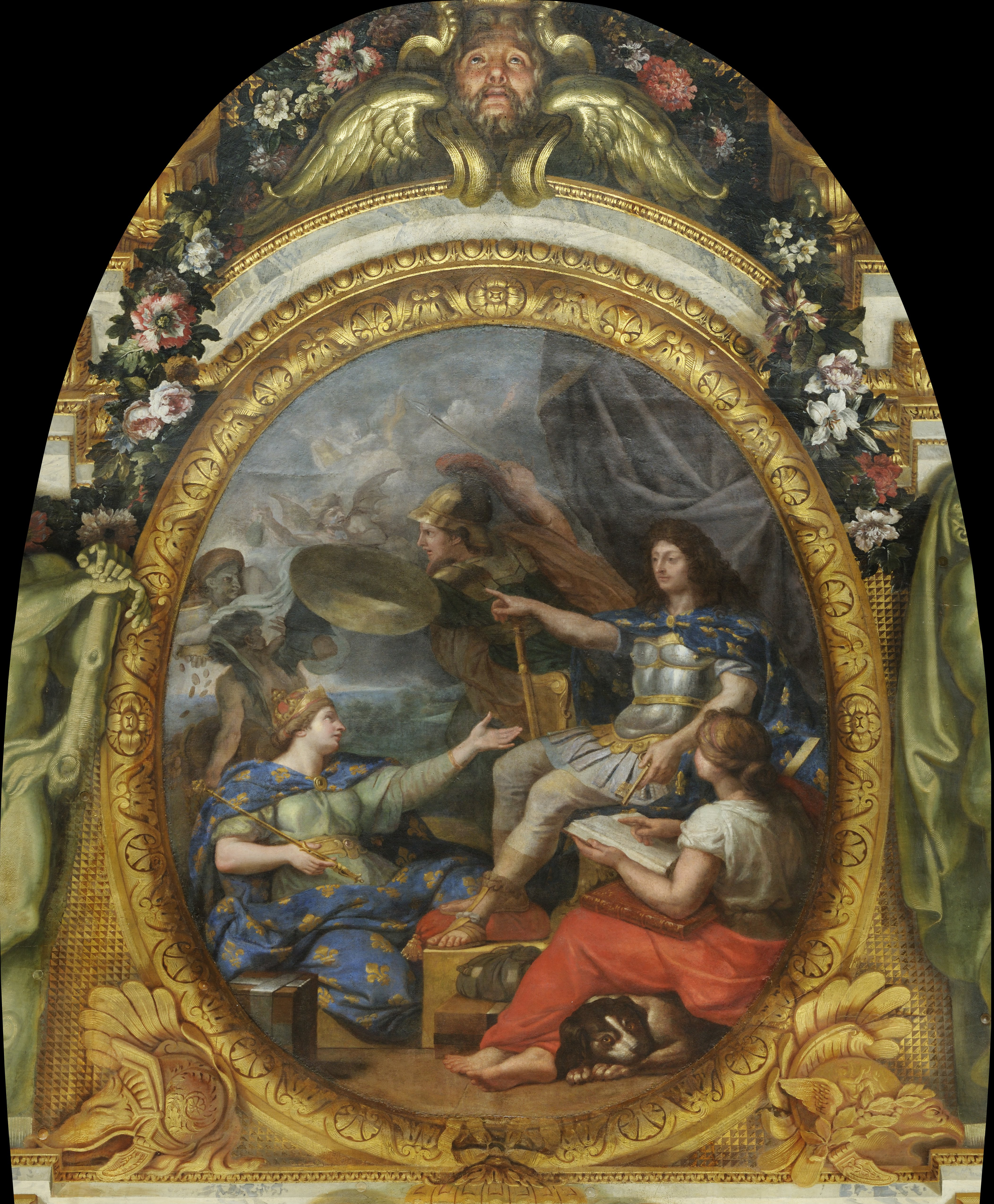
Order restored to the Kingdom's finances, 1662

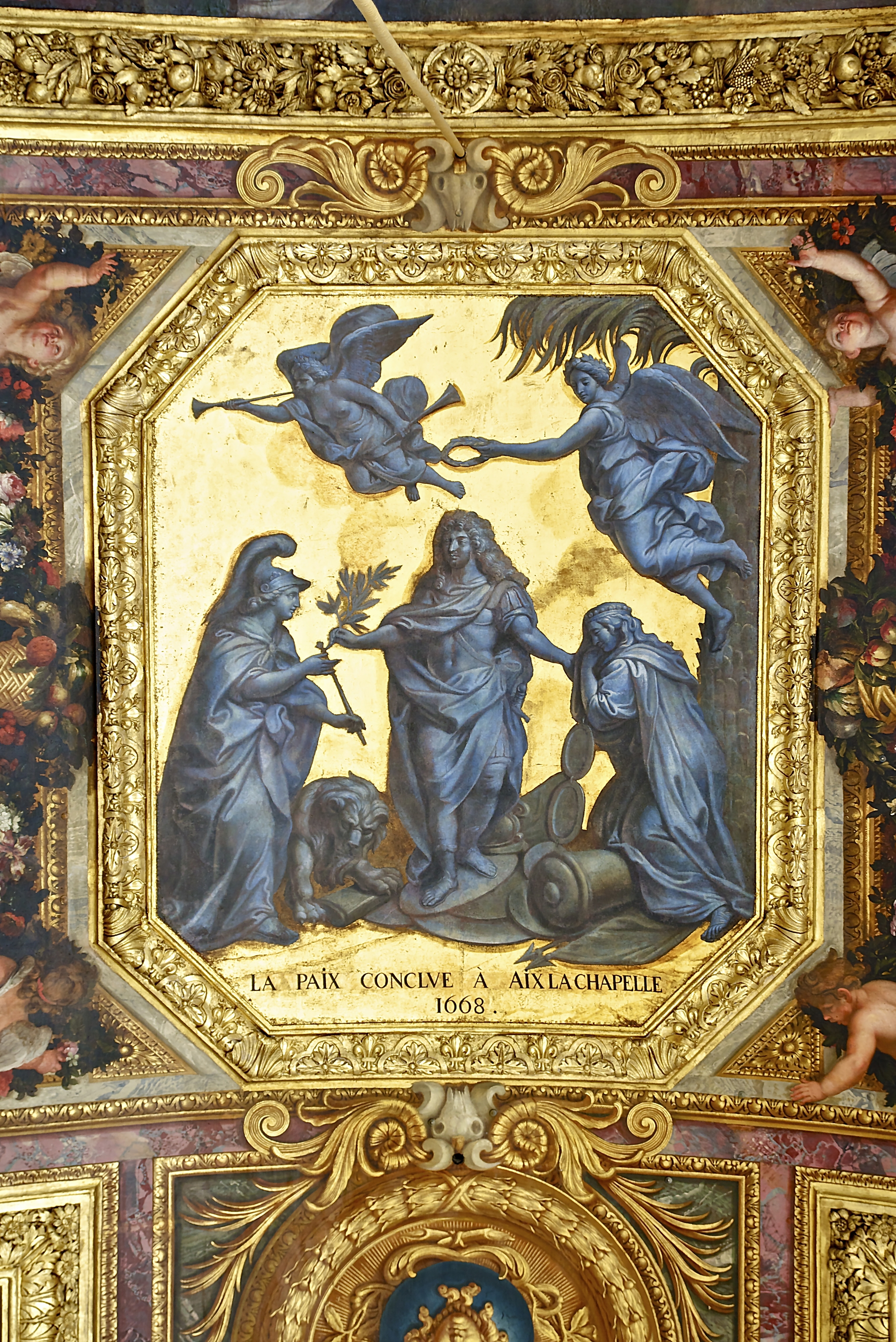
The peace concluded in Aix-la-Chapelle, 1668

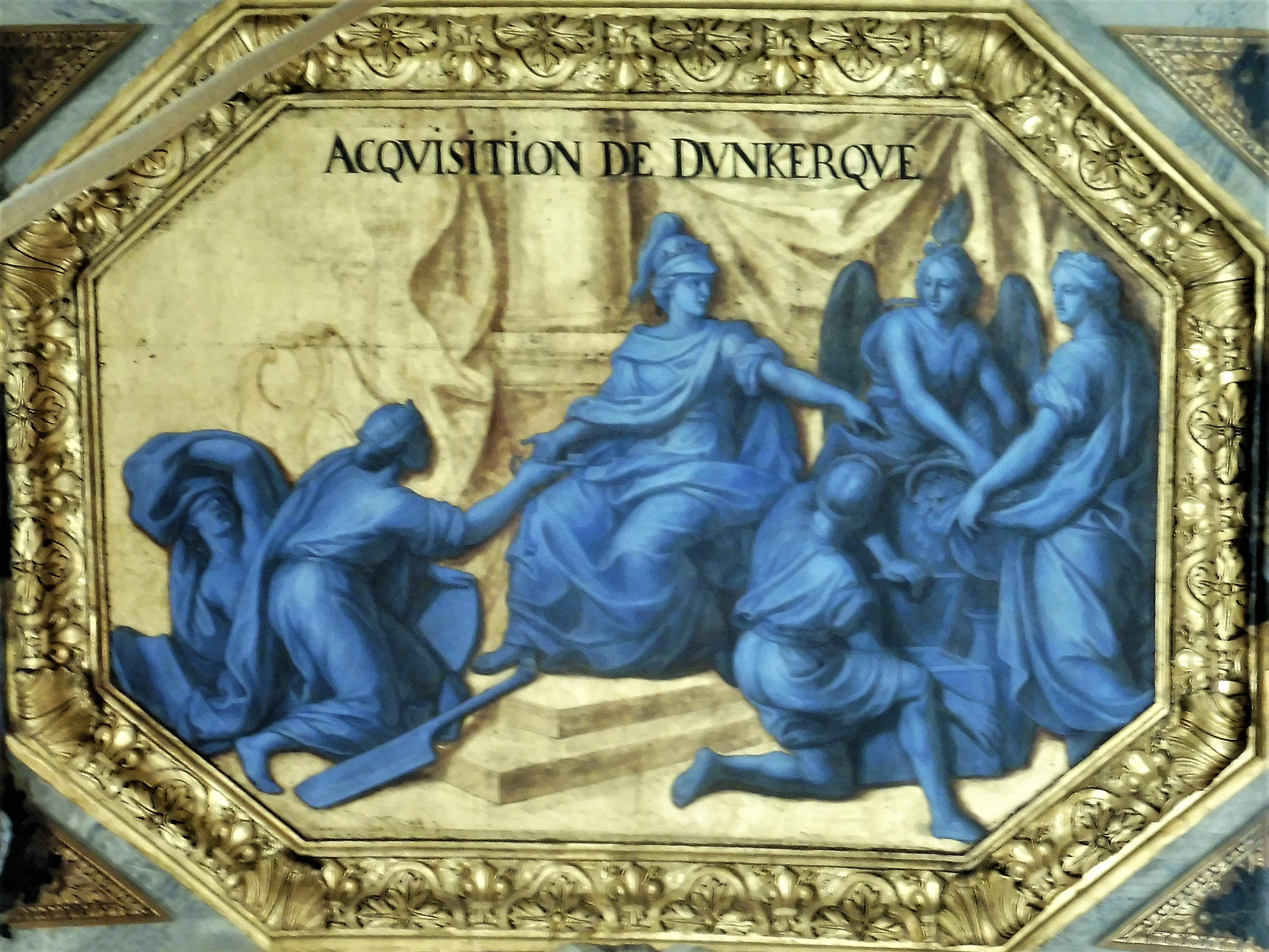
Acquisition of Dunkirk, 1662

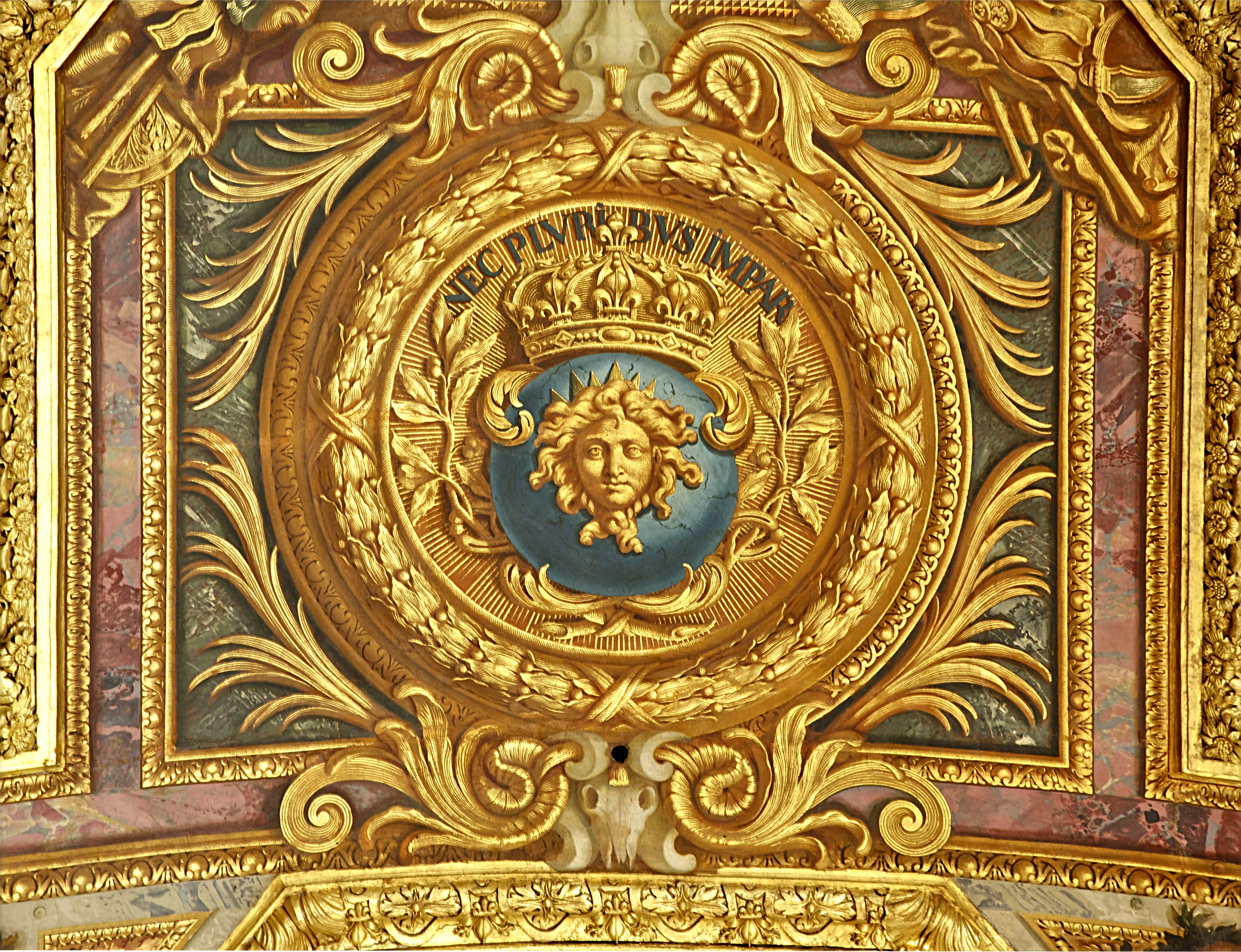
Symbol of Louis XIV

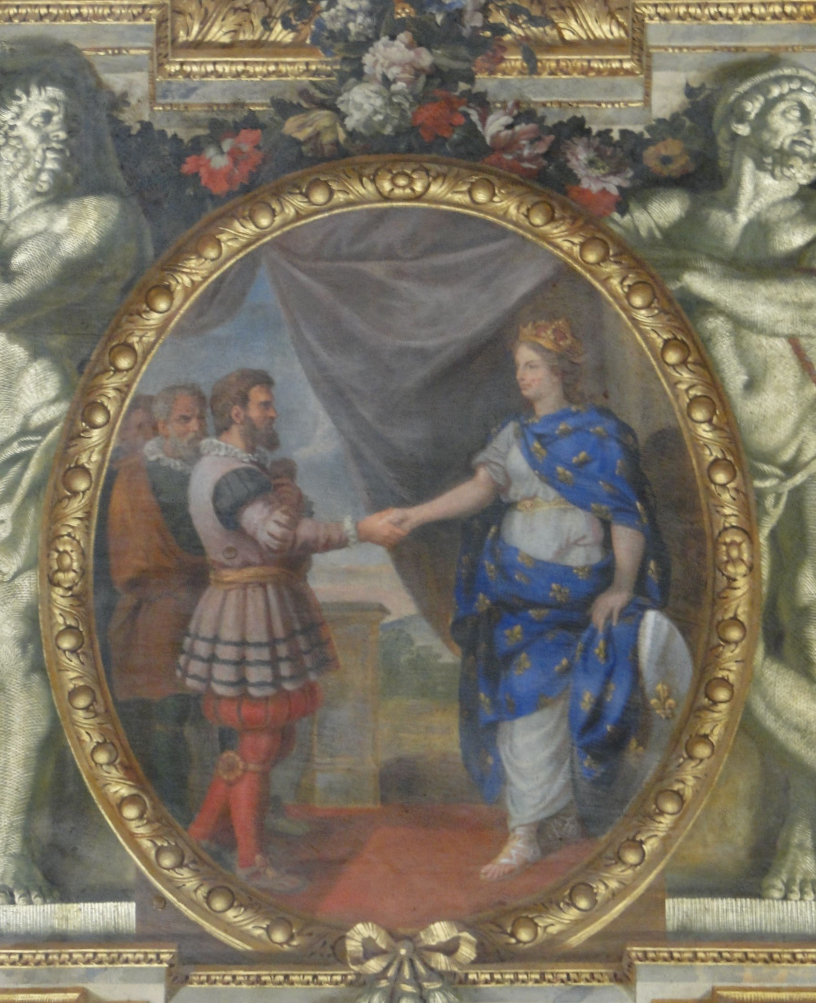
Renewal of the alliance with the Swiss, 1663: The allegory of France extending her hand to the Swiss envoys, Johann Heinrich Waser, Mayor of Zürich and head of the Swiss delegation, and Anton von Graffenried, the Envoy of the Canton of Bern (№ 27)

== Functions ==
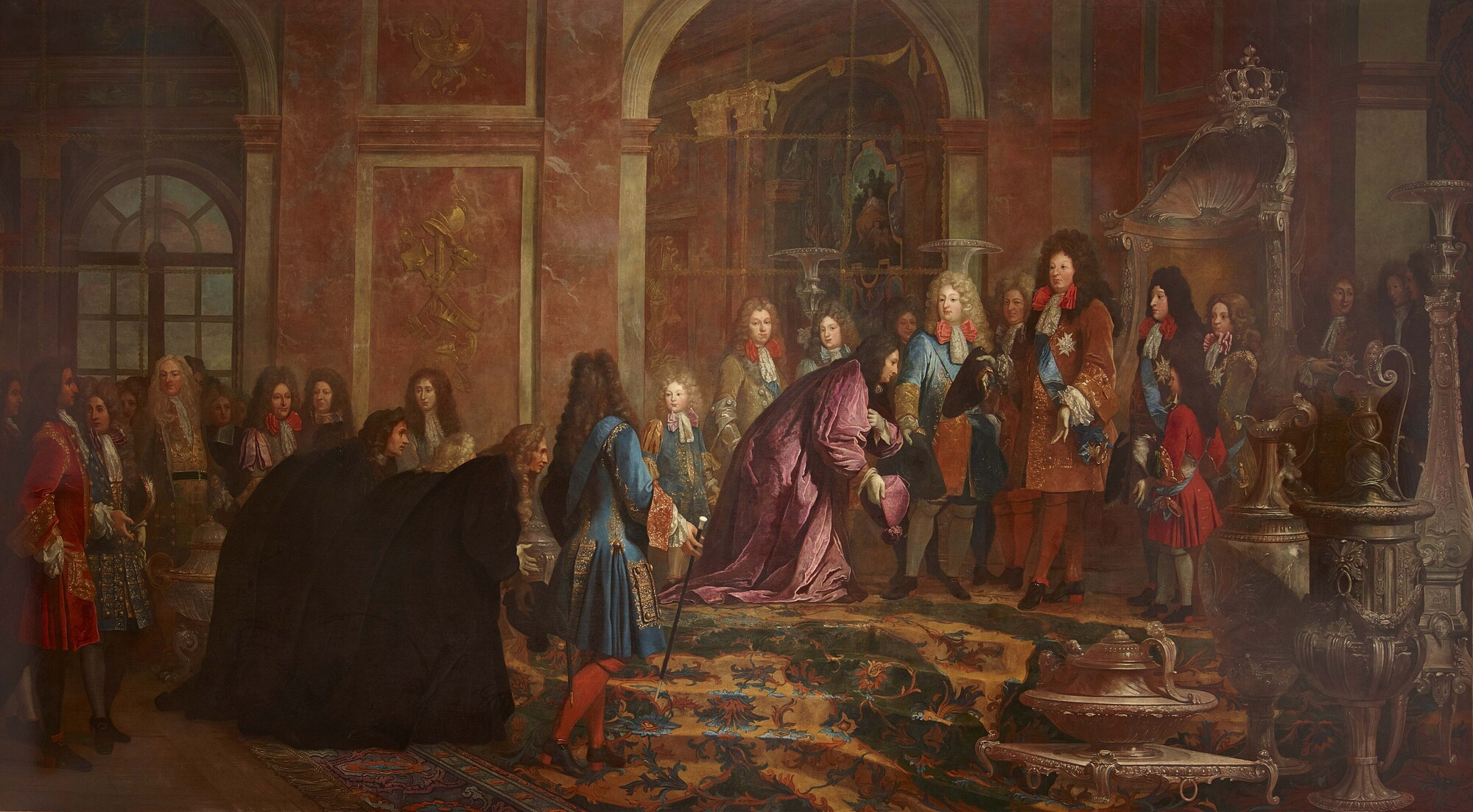
Louis XIV receiving the Doge of Genoa at Versailles on 15 May 1685

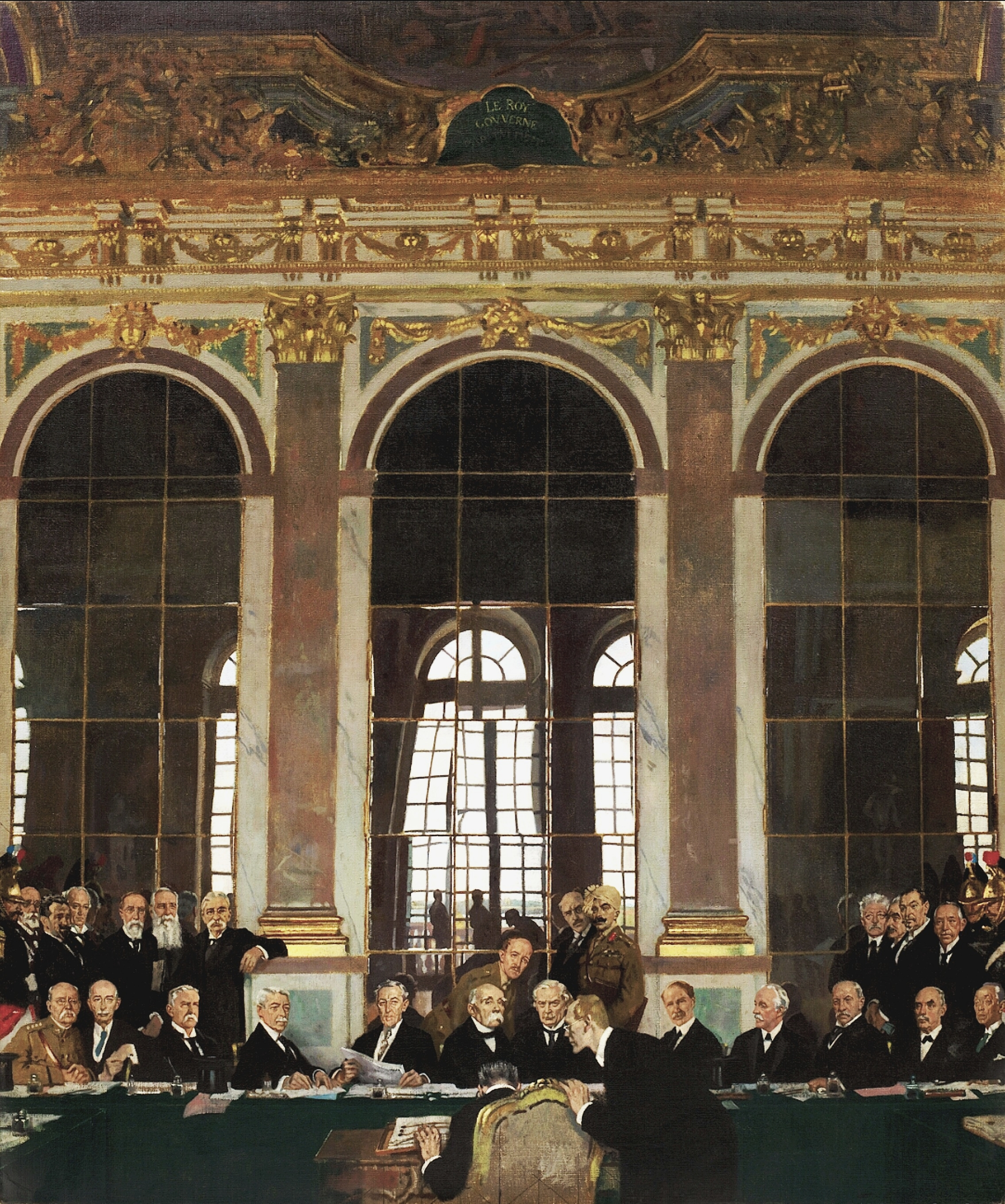
The Signing of Peace in the Hall of Mirrors, by William Orpen, depicts the peace agreement to end World War I, 28 June 1919

In the 17th century, the hall's main purpose was to serve as a kind of covered promenade for Louis XIV's visit to the chapel. He entered the gallery at least once a day and from 1701, the King's bedroom lay behind the middle wall of the gallery. Courtiers assembled to meet the King and members of the royal family and might make a particular request by intoning: "Sire, Marly?". This was the manner in which nobles were able to obtain a much sought-after invitation to one of the king's house parties at the Château de Marly, a villa Louis XIV had built north of Versailles on the route to Saint-Germain-en-Laye.

Its central location and size predestined the Hall of Mirrors as a place for court festivities such as the wedding of the Louis, Duke of Burgundy with Marie Adélaïde of Savoy, the wedding of Louis, Dauphin of France and Maria Teresa Rafaela of Spain in 1645 and the wedding of the Dauphin, future king Louis XVI, and Marie Antoinette in 1770. In the successive reigns of Louis XV and Louis XVI, the Hall of Mirrors continued to serve for family and court functions.

Embassies, births, and marriages were held in this room. The most celebrated event of the 18th century on 25 February 1745 was the celebrated Yew Tree Ball. It was during this costume ball that Louis XV, who was dressed as a yew tree, met Jeanne-Antoinette Poisson d'Étiolles, who was costumed as Diana, goddess of the hunt. Jeanne-Antoinette, who became Louis XV's mistress, is better known to history as Madame de Pompadour.

Foreign audiences were granted, including that of the Doge of Genoa in 1685 and the embassy of Sultan Mahmud I of the Ottoman Empire in 1742. Of all the events that transpired in this room during the reign of Louis XIV, the Siamese Embassy of 1685–1686 has been cited as the most opulent. At this time, the Hall of Mirrors and the grand appartements were still decorated with the original silver furniture. In its heyday, over 3,000 candles were used to light the Hall of Mirrors. In February 1715, Louis XIV held his last embassy in the hall when he received Mohammad Reza Beg, ambassador of the Shah of Persia, Sultan Husayn.

The Second German Empire was established in the Hall of Mirrors on 18 January 1871, after the German siege of Paris at the conclusion of the Franco-Prussian War. In a ceremony led by Otto von Bismarck, the Prussian king, Wilhelm I, the assembled German princes and lords declared William I the German emperor in the Hall of Mirrors.

Versailles was chosen because it was the headquarters of the united German armies. The Hall of Mirrors was chosen specifically because its ceiling paintings glorified the conquest of German territories by France. The French nation regarded this ceremony as deeply humiliating. The event greatly contributed to the further accretion of the Franco-German enmity.

A few decades later French Prime Minister Georges Clemenceau consciously chose the Hall of Mirrors as the site to sign the Treaty of Versailles on 28 June 1919, that officially ended World War I. Thus, the Entente dismantled the German Empire in the very room where it had been proclaimed.

The Hall of Mirrors remains reserved for official ceremonies of the French Republic. Notable events during the 20th century were the reception of U.S. President John F. Kennedy and his wife by Charles de Gaulle, the reception of the Shah of Iran Mohammad Reza Pahlavi by Valéry Giscard d'Estaing in 1974 or the invitation of representatives of the Group of Seven summit by President François Mitterrand from 4 to 6 June 1982.

== Gallery ==
Historical depictions of the Hall of Mirrors
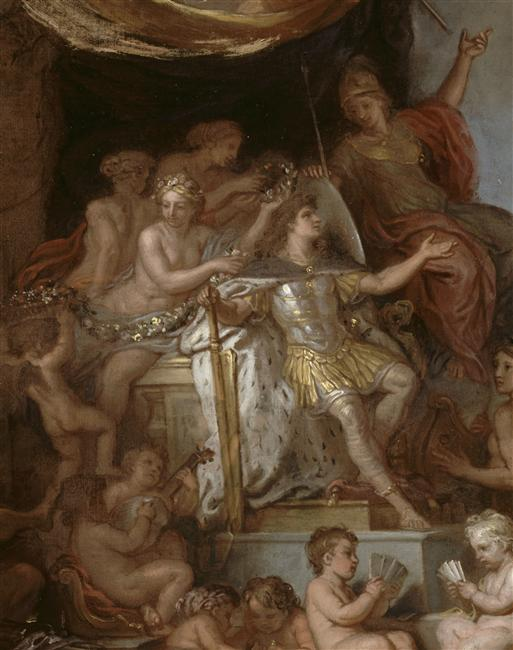
Le roi gouverne par lui-même, the modello for the central panel of the ceiling of the Hall of Mirrors c. 1680 by Charles Le Brun, (1619–1690).

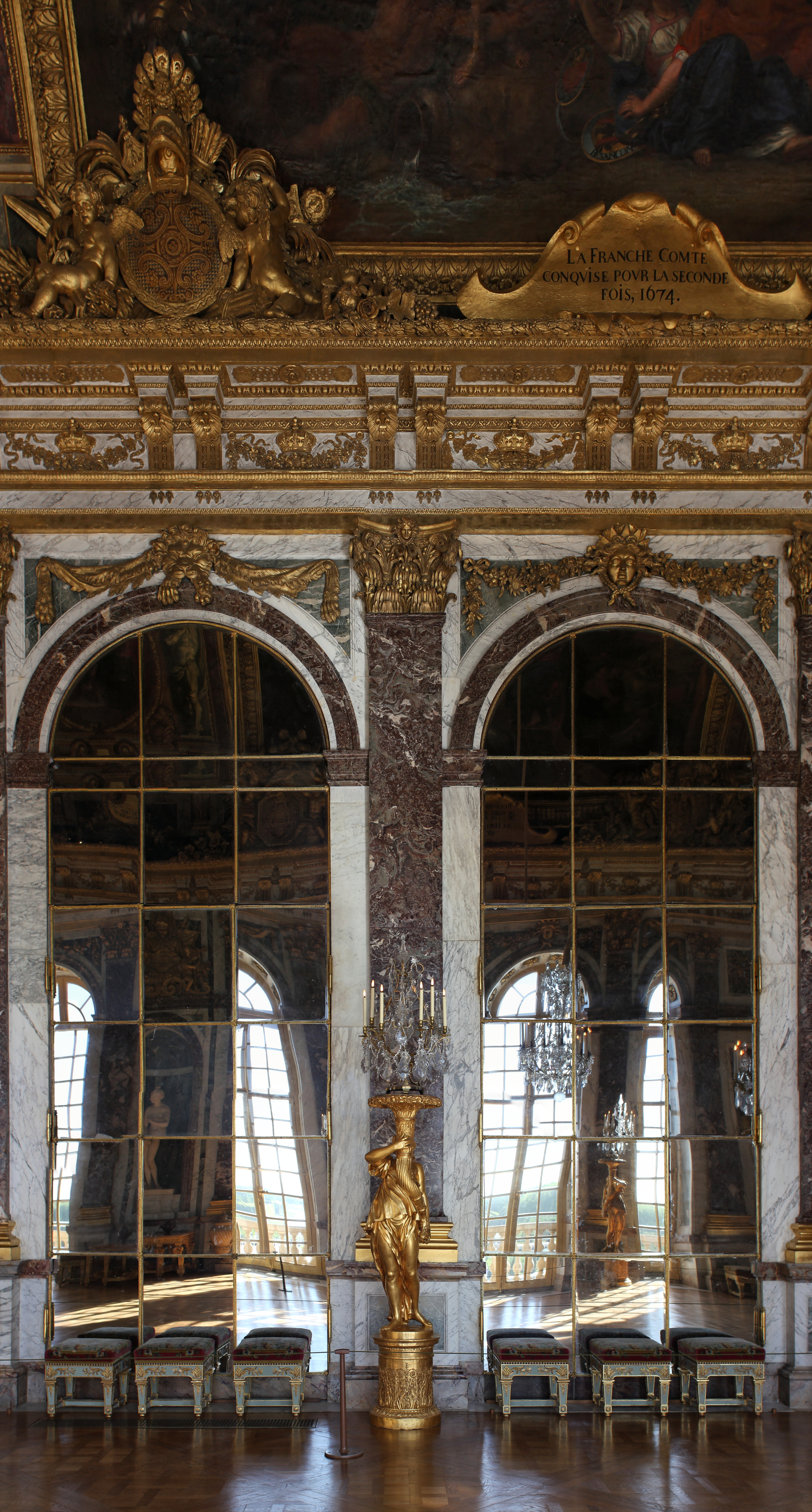
Mirror panels in the Hall of Mirrors

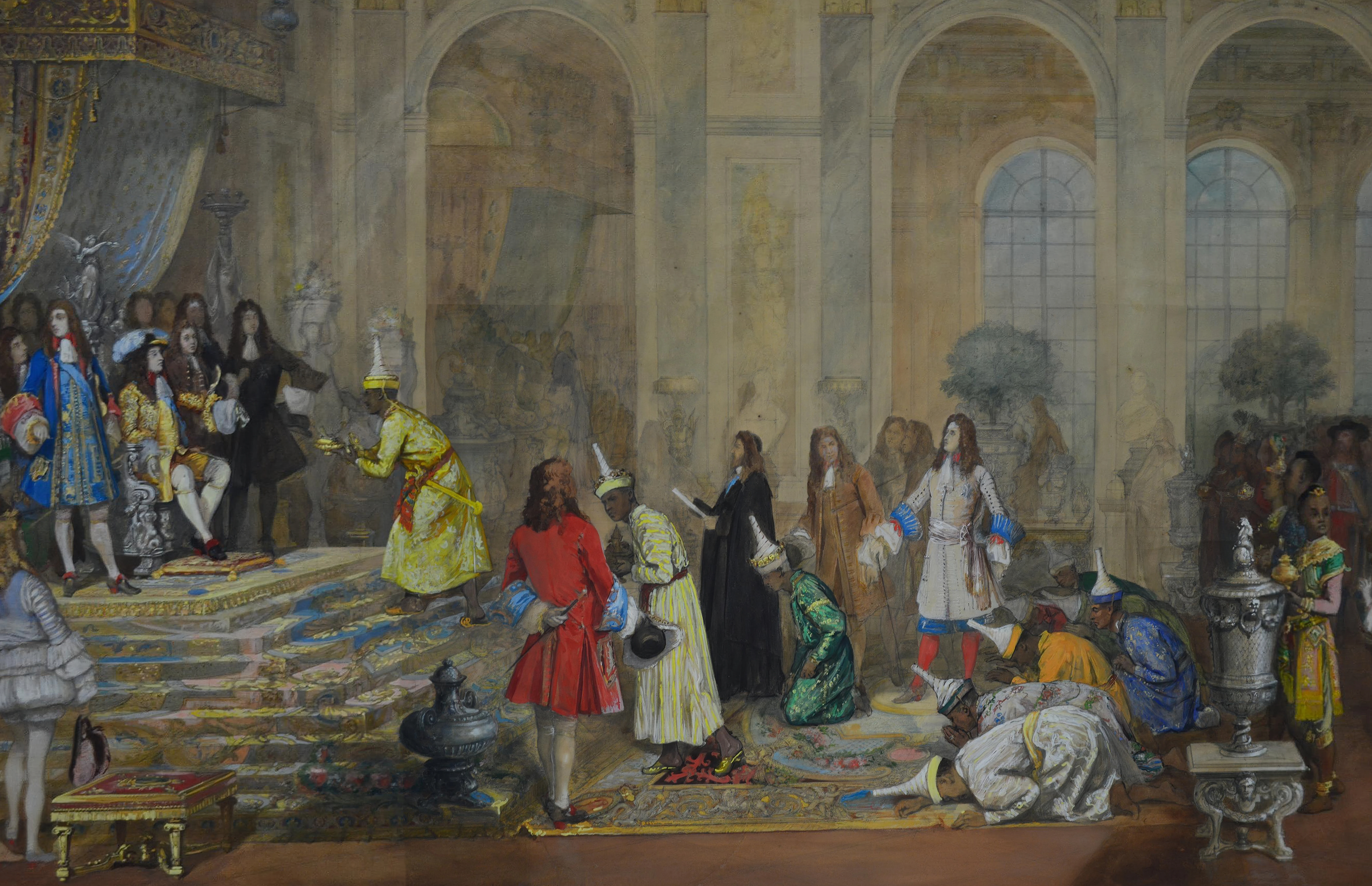
The Siamese Embassy. Kosa Pan presents King Narai's letter to Louis XIV at Versailles, 1 September 1686

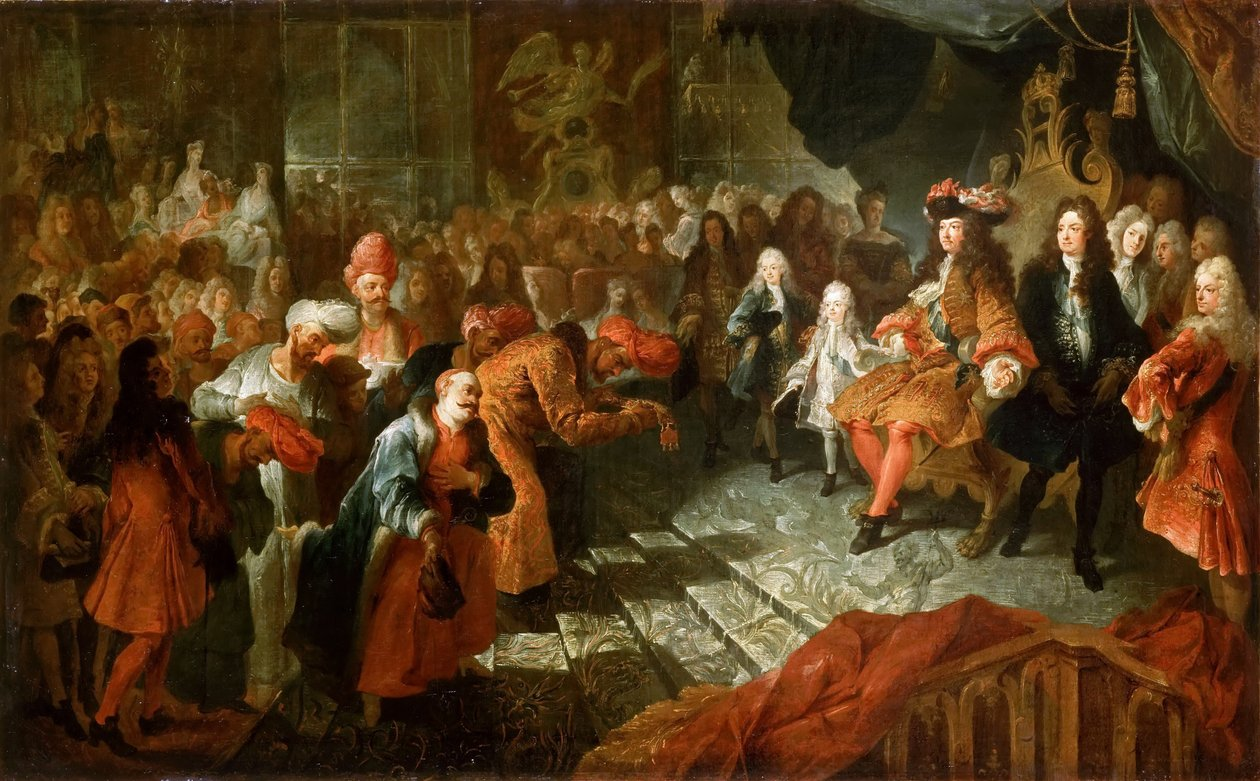
Embassy of Mehemet Raza-Bey, ambassador of the Shah of Persia, 19 February 1715 c. 1715 attributed to Antoine Coypel

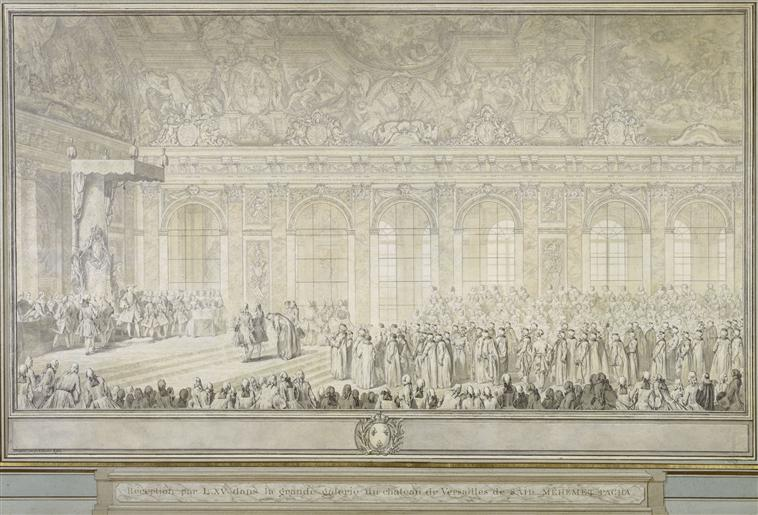
Turkish Embassy to Louis XV, 1742 by Charles-Nicolas Cochin, (1715–1790)

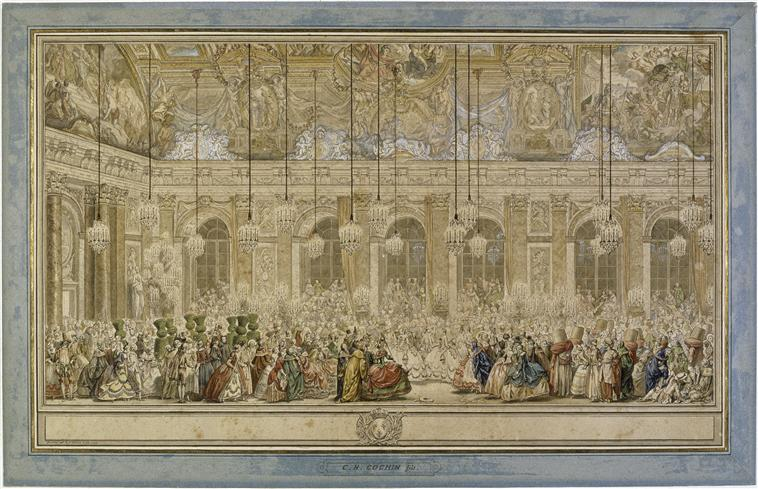
The Ball of the Yew Trees given in February 1745 by Charles-Nicolas Cochin, (1715–1790)

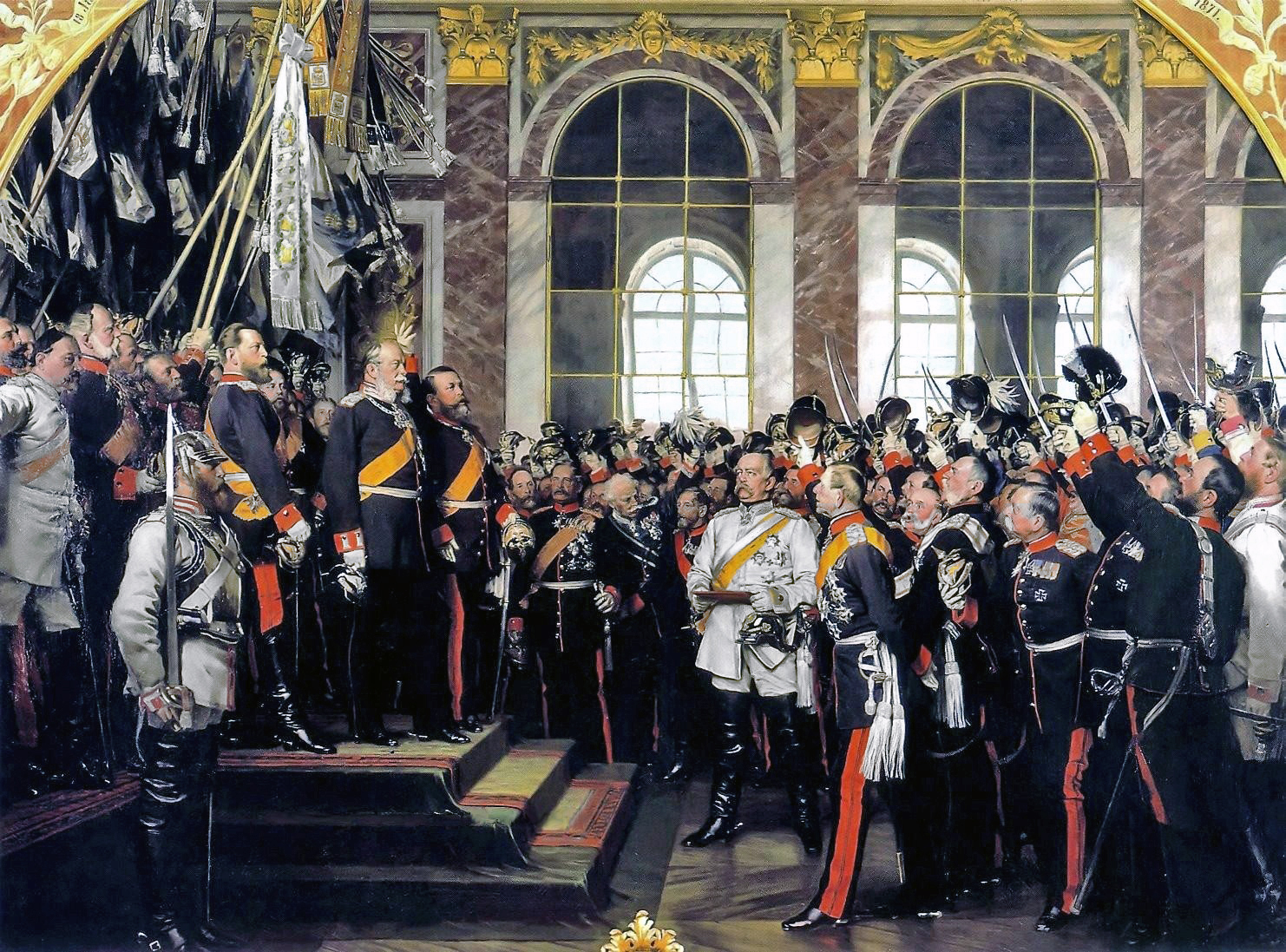
Proclamation of the Second German Empire in 1871 by Anton von Werner

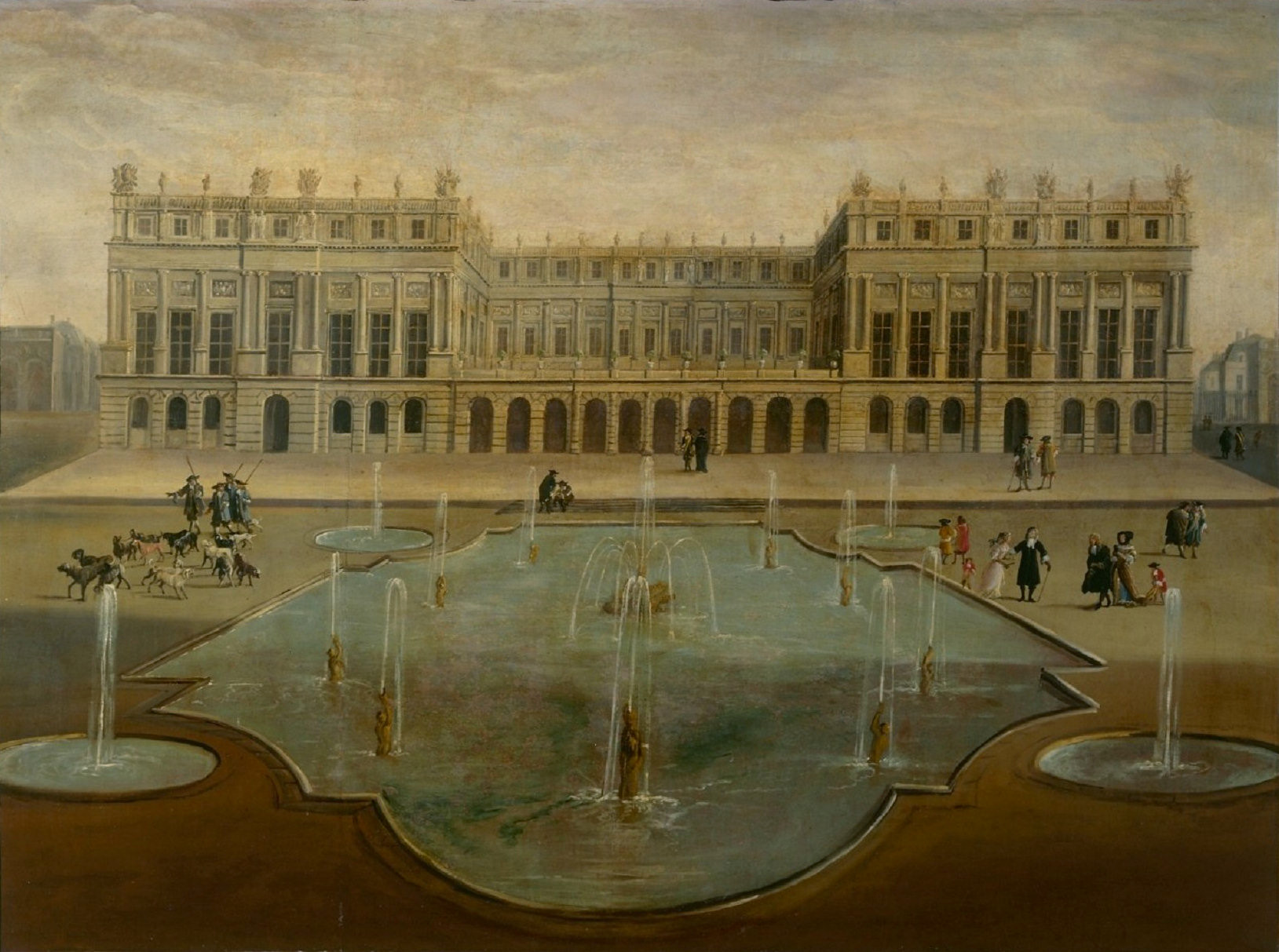
The eastern facade of the palace before the construction of the Hall of Mirrors, 1675

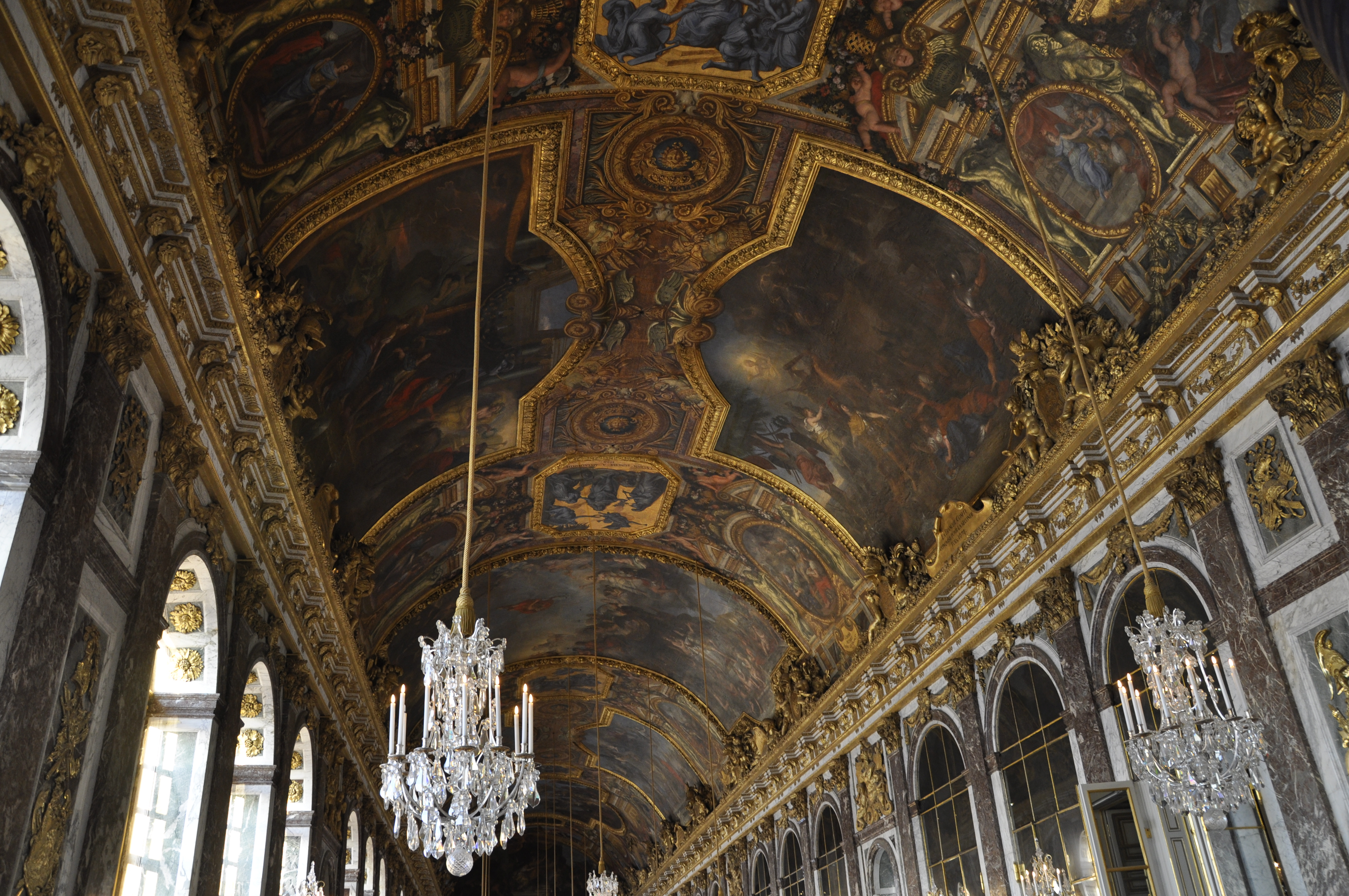
Ceiling of the Hall of Mirrors.

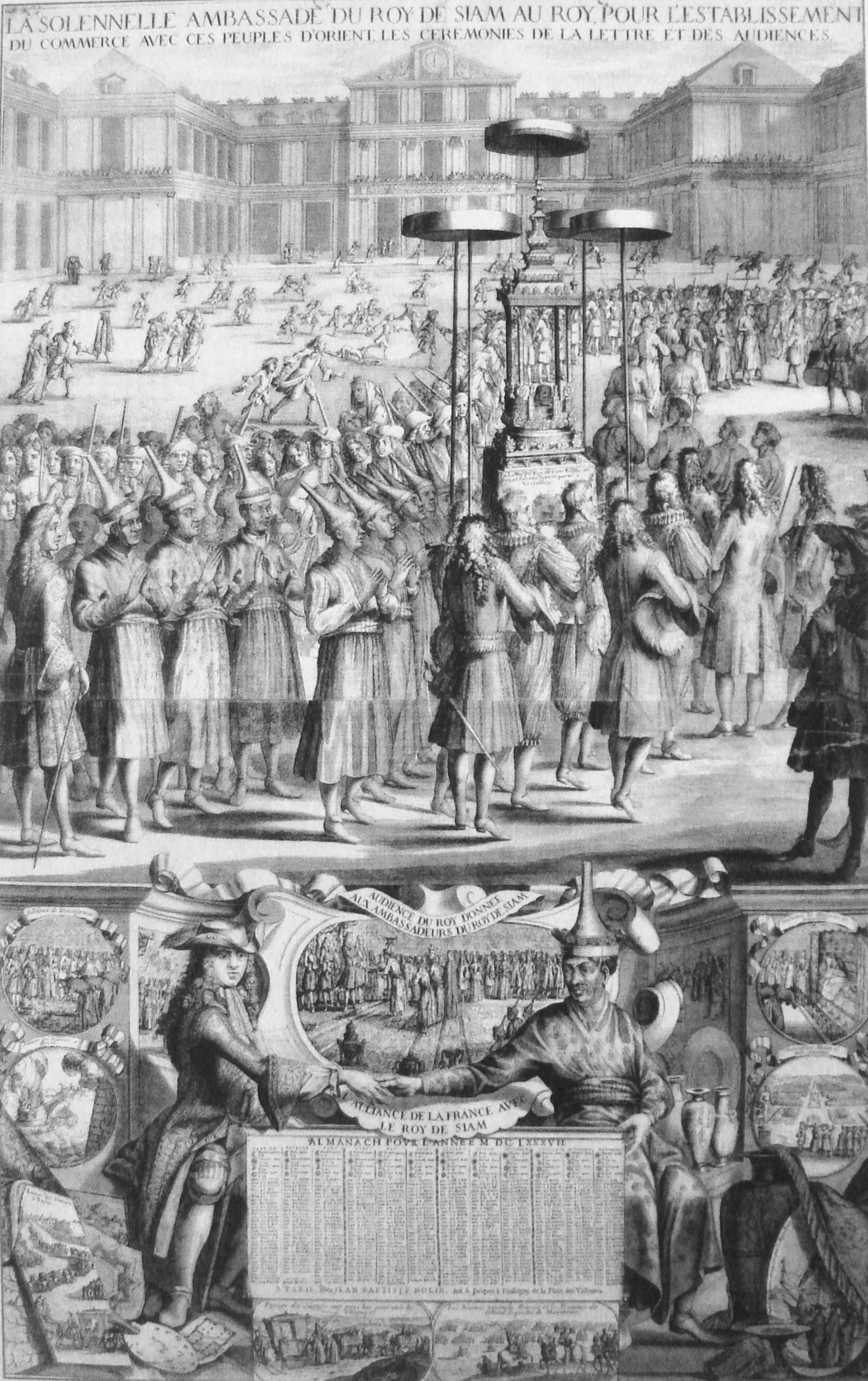
Depiction of the Siamese embassy in Versailles, in a 1687 French almanac.
