= Hagopdjan de Deritchan =

Safavid Consul in Kingdom of France
- In office 1715–1726
- Monarch: Soltan Hoseyn
- Preceded by: Mohammad Reza Beg

Personal details
- Died: 25 August 1726 Marseille, Kingdom of France

Portrait by Antoine Watteau

Hagopdjan de Deritchan (French: Acoljean de Ritchan, Armenian: Յակոբճան դի Տէրիչան; died 25 August 1726), born Hakobjan Arhitchanents, was an Armenian merchant who served as the first Safavid consul in Marseille from 1715 until his death. He replaced the ambassador Mohammad Reza Beg (Méhémet Riza Beg in French sources) as the principal Safavid diplomat in France during the reign of king Sultan Husayn (1694–1722).

== Name ==
Hagopdjan is a form derived from the name Hagop, commonly used at that time among Armenians from Persia. The preposition "di", which indicates affiliation, was adopted by Hagopdjan from Italian, as was done frequently among Armenian merchants of the seventeenth and eighteenth centuries. The French struggled to write his name, and therefore called him Acoljean of Ritchan, Agop Jean or Agobian. On a document stored at the Chamber of Commerce of Marseilles, his signature is kept: Hagopdjan di Deritchan, which means Hagopdjan son of Deritchan. The name of his father, Deritchan, is rare.

== Biography ==
In 1714, the then incumbent king (shah) of Safavid Iran, Sultan Husayn, decided to send to Louis XIV an embassy for the purpose of signing a diplomatic and trade treaty between the two nations. He chose to represent Mohammad Reza Beg, mayor of Yerevan as the new Safavid ambassador to France, and the leader of the mission. The journey of the ambassador to France would prove to be difficult, because he had to cross territory of the neighboring Ottoman Empire – Safavid Iran's archrival, which was therefore hostile territory. The mayor of Yerevan chose Hagopdjan, of Armenian origin, who was the richest merchant of the city, to accompany as well as to protect him.

After Mohammad Reza Beg returned to Yerevan in 1715, Hagopdjan remained in France as the Safavid consul. First, he remained a few weeks in Paris, where the regent Philippe d'Orléans, gave him a thousand pounds for his stay. Some time later, he traveled to Marseille, arriving on December 2 1715, and returned to his post.

His task was not easy and further complicated by the fact that the Safavid king, Sultan Husayn, did not ratify the treaty immediately. When he did, in 1722, the situation in Persia had become very chaotic and the country was on the brink of anarchy, with the dynasty being on the brink of being overthrown by rebellious Pashtuns from within the far eastern borders. Furthermore, the empire was enduring two major invasions at the same time as well; by the Safavids' archrival the Ottoman Empire, as well as by the Russian Empire, the latter who invaded in June 1722. The consul was somewhat "forgotten" by the authorities of his country and had to be content to live on a meager pension from the king of France. He was brought to intervene with the Chamber of Commerce to enforce the tax privileges of the Persians in France.

Hagopdjan de Deritchan died in Marseille on 25 August 1726 in poverty and oblivion.

== Sources ==
- Guillaume Aral, « Hagopdjan de Deritchan, consul de Perse à Marseille (1715-1728) », dans Revue du monde arménien moderne et contemporain, Tome 6 (2001), Paris, pp. 29-36.
- Chardonnet, Sylvain (March 2025). "Le passage de Mehmet Reza beg, kalantar d'Erevan et ambassadeur de Perse, à Moulins et en Bourbonnais (janvier 1715)". Études Bourbonnaises (in French). 381. Moulins: Société bourbonnaise des études locales: 161–185. ISSN 0980-7225.
- Gérard Dédéyan (dir.), Histoire du peuple arménien, Privat, Toulouse, 2007 (ISBN 978-2-7089-6874-5), p. 916.
