= The Yew Tree Ball =

The Yew Tree Ball (French: Le bal des ifs) was a masked ball held in the Hall of Mirrors at Versailles on the night of 25–26 February 1745. 1,500 people attended. King Louis XV and several of his gentlemen courtiers appeared dressed as topiary yew trees. The ball is notorious for being the venue in which the king made contact with Jeanne-Antoinette Poisson. He had first seen her while hunting at Senart. On 14 September 1745, Poisson was officially presented to the Court as the Marquise de Pompadour. She became the king’s official mistress until her death in 1764.

== Gallery ==
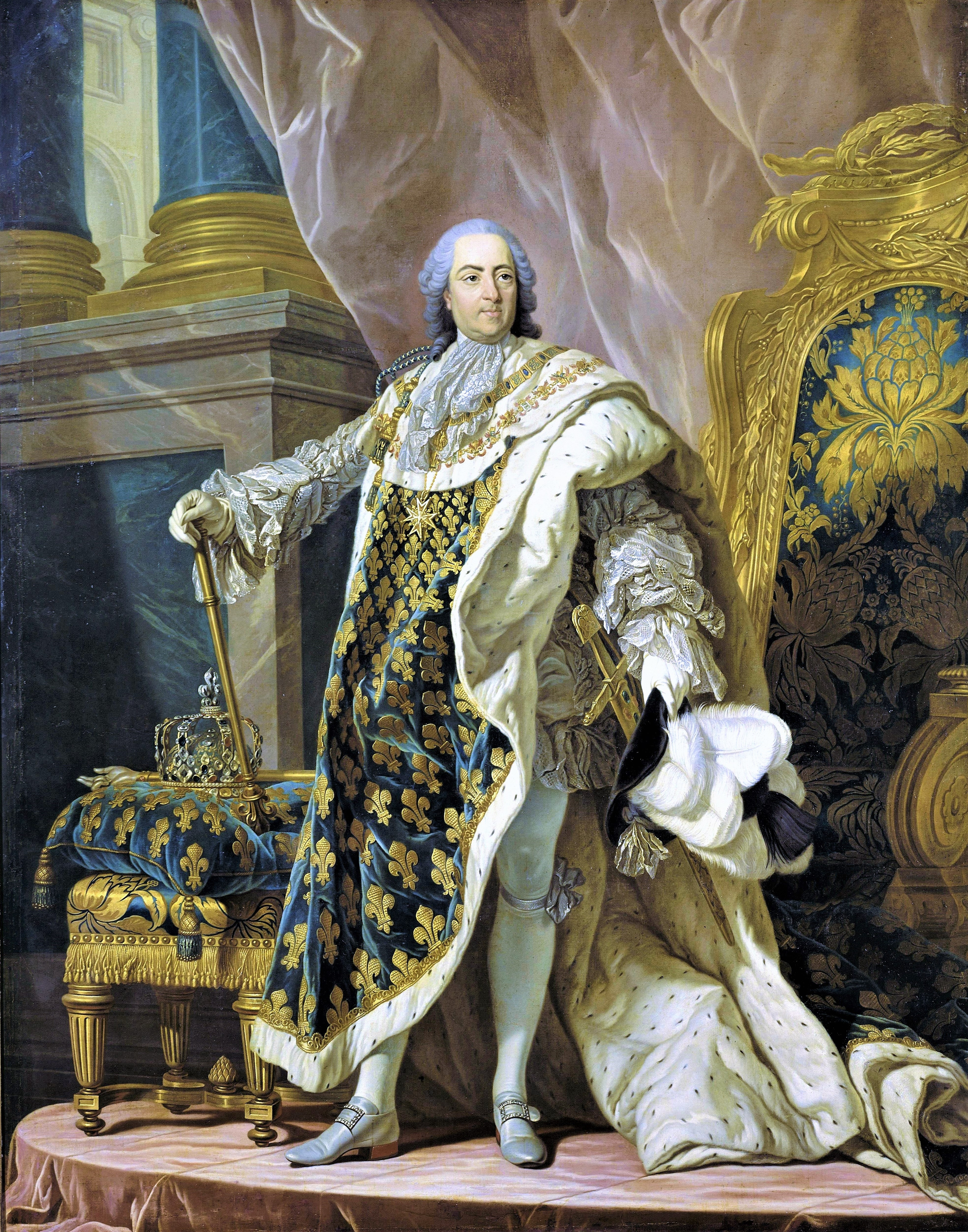
Louis XV

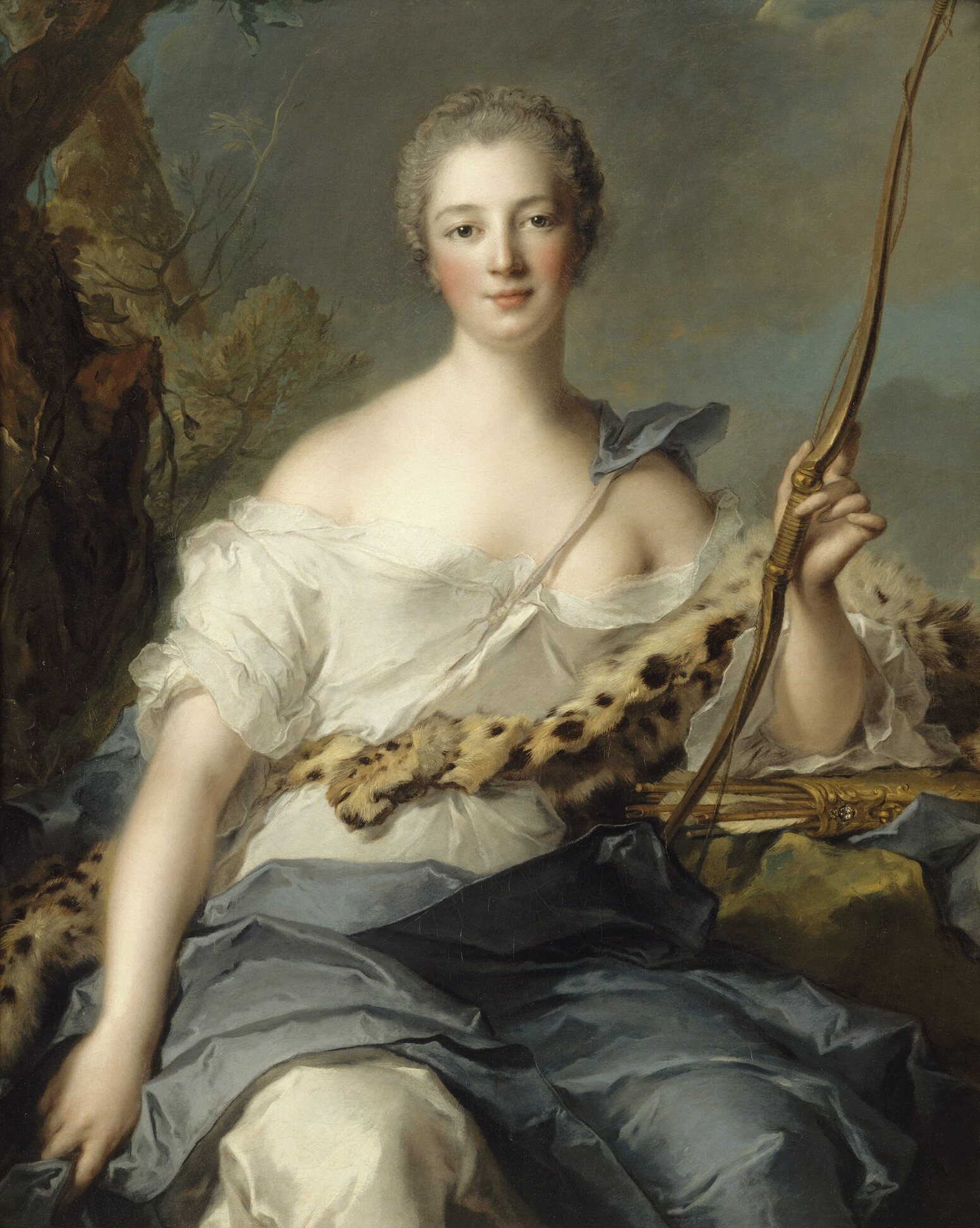
Pompadour dressed as Diana, 1746

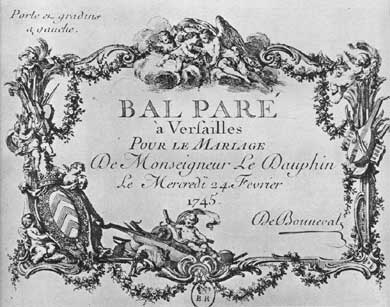
Invitation to the ball

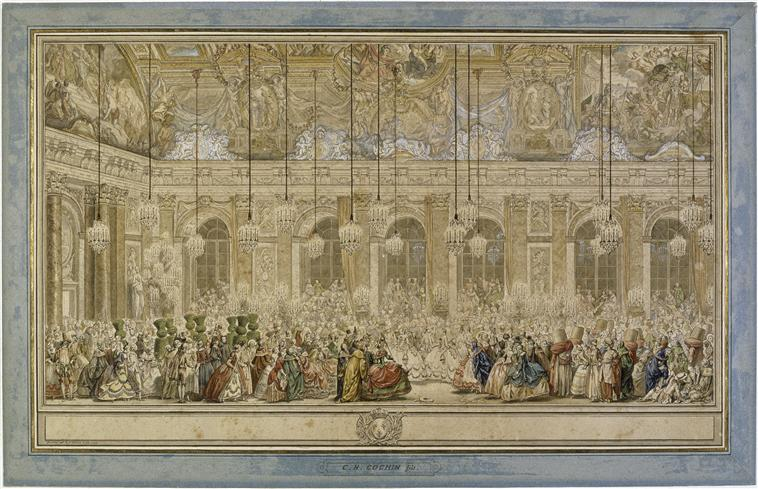
The Yew Tree Ball, 1745
