= Étienne Padery =

Étienne Padery (born Athens, ca. 1674) was an Ottoman-born Greek, who served as a translator to the French embassy in Constantinople, and later as a French consul to the Safavid Empire.

== Sources ==
- Floor, Willem; Herzig, Edmund, eds. (2015). Iran and the World in the Safavid Age. I.B.Tauris. p. 312. ISBN 978-1780769905.
- Lockhart, Laurence (1958). The fall of the Ṣafavī dynasty and the Afghan occupation of Persia. Cambridge University Press. pp. 166, 164, 465.
- Matthee, Rudolph P. (1999). The Politics of Trade in Safavid Iran: Silk for Silver, 1600-1730. Cambridge: Cambridge University Press. p. 215. ISBN 978-0521641319.
- Touzard, Anne-Marie (2009). "PADERY, ETIENNE". Encyclopaedia Iranica.
