= Persian embassy to Louis XIV =

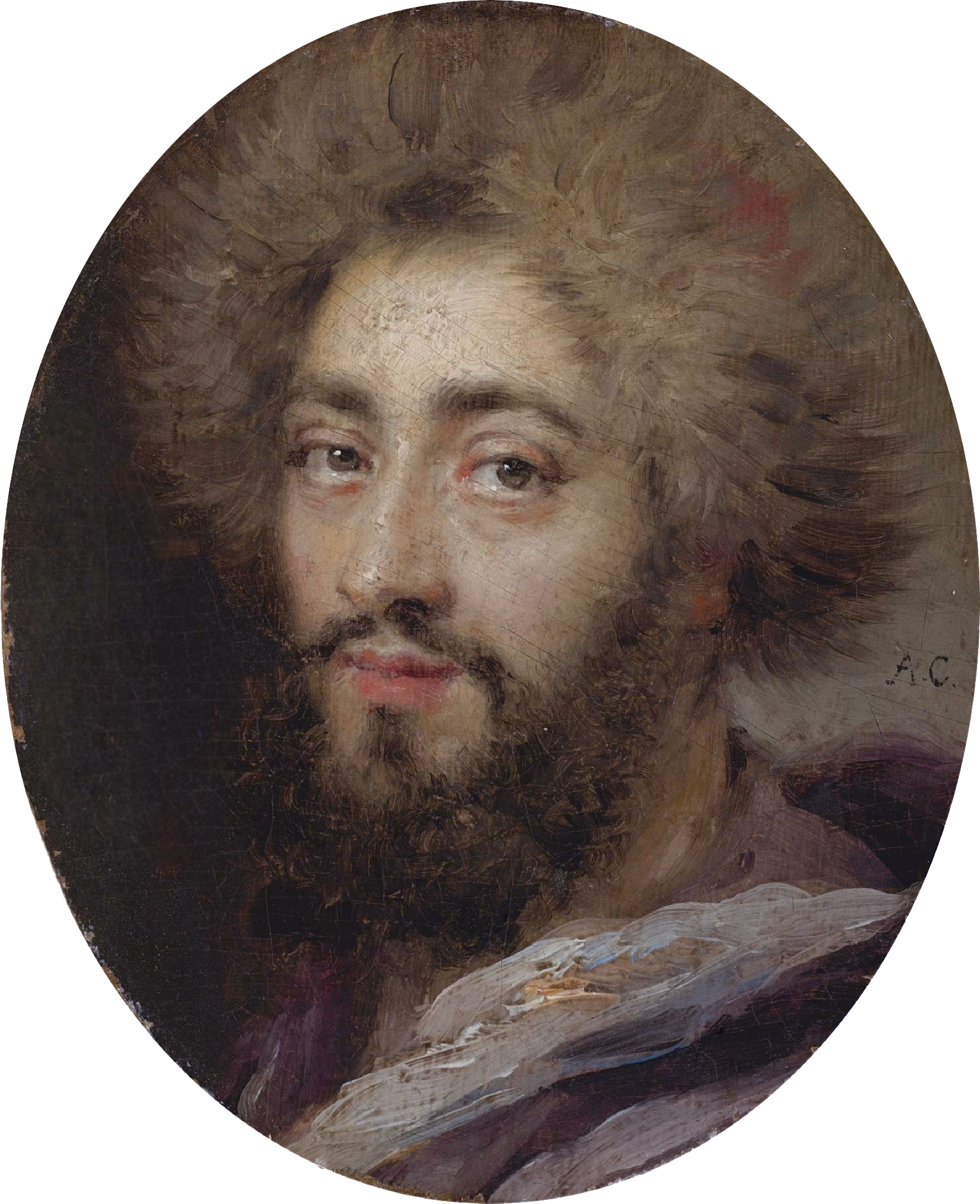
Persian ambassador Mohammad Reza Beg.

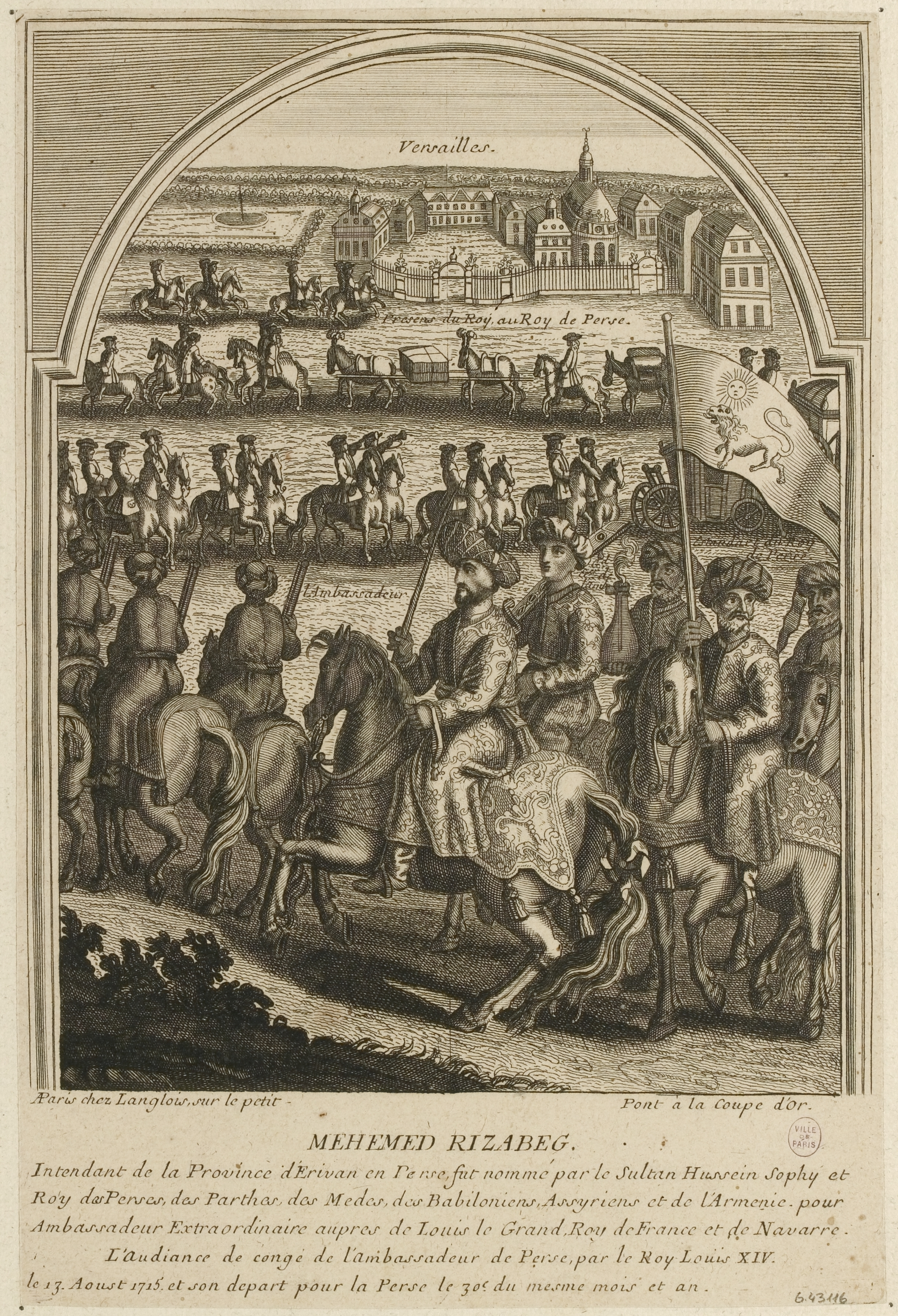
Entry of Mohammad Reza Beg in Versailles.

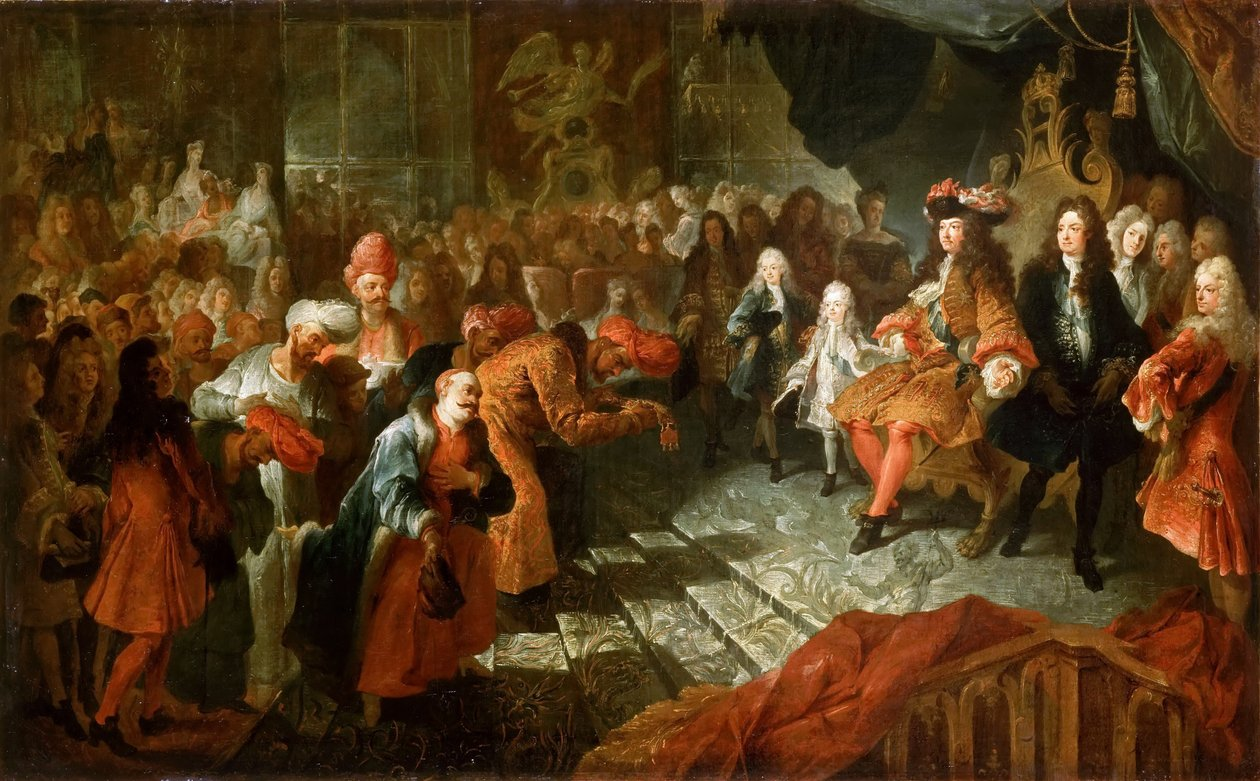
Ambassade de Persie auprès de Louis XIV, studio of Antoine Coypel, c. 1715

The Persian embassy to Louis XIV caused a dramatic flurry at the court of Louis XIV in 1715, the year of the Sun King's death. Mohammad Reza Beg (Persian: محمد رضا بیگ, romanized: Mohammad Rezâ Beg; in French sources Méhémet Riza Beg) was a high-ranking official to the Persian governor of the Iravan (Erivan) province. He had been chosen by the Safavid Persian emperor Soltan Hoseyn for the mission and travelled with a grand entourage, as suitable to the diplomat of a mighty empire.

== The embassy ==
The scene of the Persian ambassador's entry into Paris, 7 February 1715, was described by François Pidou de Saint-Olon (1646–1720), a nobleman who was delegated the diplomatic position of liaison officer to the Persian delegation:

Ten Persians or Armenians on horseback carrying long ornate rifles. Two Armenians in charge of the care of the presents of the Persian king. Two pages of the ambassador, his master of ceremonies, his secretary and the interpreter. The ambassador on a horse harnessed with the shutter. Persian and Armenian lackeys of the ambassador around his horse. The shield bearer of the ambassador carrying the standard of the Persian king, marching immediately behind him with a page who carried the sabre of the ambassador.

During several months that he spent at Versailles, Mohammad Reza Beg conducted negotiations towards establishing trade treaties between Persia and France, as well as on specific agreements concerning the installation of consulates. He conferred with the French on possible joint military operations against the Ottoman Empire. But negotiations were impeded by Louis XIV's bad state of health. Nevertheless, Mohammad Reza Beg returned to Persia in autumn 1715 bearing treaties on commerce and friendship between France and Persia that had been signed in Versailles on 13 August. As another result of the diplomatic mission, a permanent Persian consulate was established in Marseille, the main French Mediterranean port for the trade with the East, soon staffed by Hagopdjan de Deritchan.

== Influences in literature ==
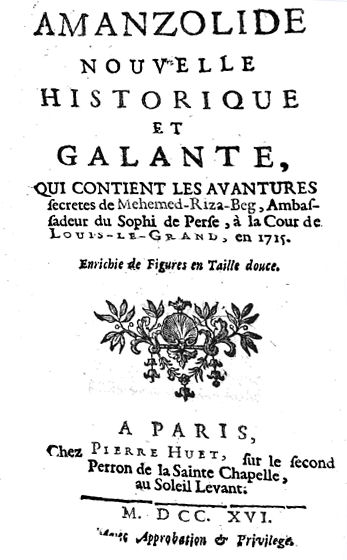
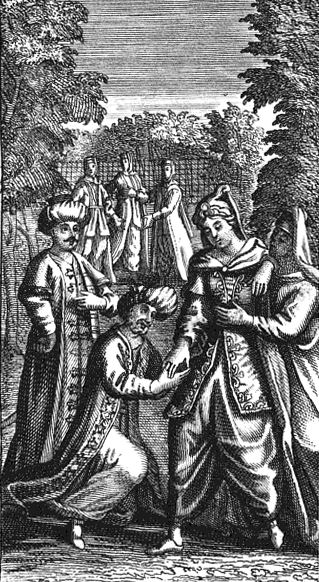
Left image: Amanzolide cover page, 1716.
Right image: Amanzolide illustration.

During the time he spent in Paris, however, feverish speculation ran rife about this exotic personage, his unpaid bills, his lavish but exotic lifestyle, the possibilities of amours, all concentrated in a pot-boiler romance of the beautiful but repeatedly kidnapped Georgian, Amanzolide, by M. d'Hostelfort, Amanzolide, nouvelle historique et galante, qui contient les aventures secrètes de Mehemed-Riza-Beg, ambassadeur du Sophi de Perse à la cour de Louis le Grand en 1715. (Paris: P. Huet, 1716). It was quickly translated into English, as Amanzolide, story of the life, the amours and the secret adventures of Mehemed-Riza-Beg, Persian ambassador to the court of Louis the Great in 1715 a true turquerie, or fanciful Eastern imagining, which did not discriminate too finely between Ottoman Turkey and Safavid Persia.

More permanent literary results were embodied in Montesquieu's Lettres Persanes (1725), in which a satiric critique of French society was placed in the pen of an imagined Persian homme de bonne volonté, a "man of good will".

The Memoirs of Saint-Simon for the year record contemporary court gossip that the ambassador was in fact an ordinary merchant from Persian lands, perhaps sent by "the governor of his province with business to transact in France" and put up as an ambassador by Pontchartrain, minister for trade and much else, essentially in a successful attempt to cheer up the aged king. He says of the ambassador "there seemed to be nothing genuine about him, and his behaviour was as disgraceful as his wretched suite and miserable presents. Moreover he produced neither credentials nor instructions from the King of Persia or his ministers".

== See also ==
- Persian embassy to Europe (1599–1602)
- Persian embassy to Europe (1609–1615)
- Franco-Persian alliance
- France-Iran relations
- Franco-Ottoman alliance
